The Queen's Birthday Honours for 2020 are appointments by some of the 16 Commonwealth realms of Queen Elizabeth II to various orders and honours to reward and highlight good works by citizens of those countries. The Birthday Honours are awarded as part of the Queen's Official Birthday celebrations during the month of June. The honours for New Zealand were announced on 1 June, and for Australia on 8 June.

The Queen's Birthday Honours for the United Kingdom would normally have been announced in June, but were delayed until the Autumn because of the COVID-19 pandemic. The honours list was  released on 10 October 2020.

United Kingdom 
Below are the individuals appointed by Elizabeth II in her right as Queen of the United Kingdom with honours within her own gift, and with the advice of the Government for other honours.

Order of the Companions of Honour

Member of the Order of Companions of Honour (CH)
 Sir Paul Brierley Smith  — Chairman, Paul Smith Limited. For services to Fashion

Knight Bachelor 

 Frank Bowling OBE — For services to Art
 Professor Edward Byrne — Vice-Chancellor and Principal, King's College London. For services to Higher Education
 Paul Benedict Crossland Carter CBE — Lately Chairman, County Councils Network and lately Leader, Kent County Council. For services to Local Government
 Professor Charles Richard Arthur Catlow FRS — Foreign Secretary, The Royal Society. For services to Leadership in Science and Research
 Nicholas Dakin — Lately Member of Parliament for Scunthorpe. For political service
 Brendan Foster CBE — For services to International and National Sport and Culture in North East England
 Anthony Christopher Gallagher — For services to Land Development and the Property Business
 The Rt. Hon. David George Hanson — Lately Member of Parliament for Delyn. For political service
 Tommy Steele (Thomas Hicks) OBE — For services to Entertainment and charity
 Professor Stephen Townley Holgate CBE — MRC Clinical Professor of Immunopharmacology and Honorary Consultant Physician, University of Southampton. For services to Medical Research
 Professor Nasser David Khalili — Philanthropist. For services to Interfaith Relations and charity
 Andrew MacKenzie — Chief Executive Officer, BHP Group, Melbourne, Australia. For services to business, science, technology and UK/Australia relations
 Geoffrey John Mulgan CBE — Chief Executive, NESTA. For services to the Creative Economy
 Professor Philip Redmond CBE — For services to Broadcasting and Arts in the Regions
 Donald Runnicles OBE — General Music Director of Deutsche Oper Berlin. For services to music
 Professor John Roy Sambles FRS — Professor, Department of Physics, University of Exeter. For services to Scientific Research and Outreach
 David Courtney Suchet CBE — Actor. For services to Drama and charity

Order of the Bath

Knight Grand Cross of the Order of the Bath (GCB) 
 Military
 Air Chief Marshal Sir Stephen Hillier,

Knight/Dame Commander of the Order of the Bath (KCB/DCB) 
 Military
 Admiral Timothy Fraser, 
 Air Chief Marshal Michael Wigston, 

 Civil
 Clare Moriarty CB — Lately Permanent Secretary, Department for Exiting the European Union and Department for the Environment, Food and Rural Affairs. For public service
 David Robert Sterling — Head, Northern Ireland Civil Service. For services to Government in Northern Ireland

Companion of the Order of the Bath (CB) 
 Military
 Rear Admiral James Norman MacLeod
 Rear Admiral Michael Keith Utley
 The Venerable Clinton Matthew Langston
 Major General Gerald Ian Mitchell
 Air Vice-Marshal Christina Reid Elliot
 Air Vice-Marshal Harvey Smyth

 Civil
 Samantha Mary Constance Beckett OBE — Director General, EU Exit and Analysis, Department for Business, Energy and Industrial Strategy. For public service
 Professor Saverio Peter Borriello — Chief Executive, Veterinary Medicines Directorate. For services to Global Animal Health and Tackling Anti-Microbial Resistance
 Rowena Collins Rice — Director General, Attorney General's Office. For public service
 Mike Green — Chief Operating Officer, Department for Education. For services to Education
 Amy Louise Holmes OBE — Director, EU and International Trade, Department for Environment, Food and Rural Affairs. For public service
 The Hon. Thomas Robert Benedict Hurd OBE — Director General, Office for Security and Counter-Terrorism, Home Office. For services to National Security
 Julian Kelly — Lately Director General Nuclear, Ministry of Defence. For public service
 Sonia Clare Phippard CBE — Lately Director General, Environment Rural and Marine, Department for Environment, Food and Rural Affairs. For public service
 Dr David John Snowball — Lately Member, Management Board, Health and Safety Executive. For services to Occupational Health and Safety

Order of St Michael and St George

Knight/Dame Grand Cross of the Order of St Michael and St George (GCMG)
 Sir David Attenborough,  — Broadcaster and Natural Historian. For services to television broadcasting and to conservation
 Sir Tim Barrow,  — UK Ambassador to the European Union, Brussels, Belgium. For services to British foreign policy
 Sir Julian King,  — lately European Commissioner for the Security Union, Brussels, Belgium. For services to security in Europe

Knight/Dame Commander of the Order of St Michael and St George (KCMG/DCMG)
 Sarah MacIntosh CMG — UK Permanent Representative to NATO, Brussels, Belgium. For services to British foreign policy
 Graham Wrigley — Chair, CDC Group Plc. For services to International Development

Companion of the Order of St Michael and St George (CMG)
 Paul Chakravati — Deputy Director, Foreign, Commonwealth and Development Office. For services to national security
 Anna Clunes OBE — Director and Acting Director General, EU Exit, Foreign, Commonwealth and Development Office. For services to British foreign policy
 Joanna Crellin — HM Trade Commissioner (Latin America & Caribbean) and Consul-General, Sao-Paulo, Brasil. For services to trade and investment
 Miranda Curtis — lately Chair, CAMFED International and Lead Non-Executive Director, Foreign and Commonwealth Office. For services to gender equality globally 
 Nigel Dakin — Director, Foreign, Commonwealth and Development Office. For services to British foreign policy
 Andrew Gilmour — Assistant Secretary General for Human Rights, United Nations, New York, United States of America. For services to human rights
 Mark Kent — HM Ambassador, Buenos Aires, Argentina. For services to British foreign policy
 Kara Owen — British High Commissioner, Singapore. For services to British foreign policy
 Danny Payne — Chief Executive Officer, FCDO Services. For services to the British diplomatic network overseas
 Mark Robson — Director, English and Examinations, British Council. For services to UK cultural relations
 Theo Rycroft — Director, EU Exit, Europe Directorate, Foreign, Commonwealth and Development Office. For services to British foreign policy
 Ivan Smyth — Legal Counsellor, UK Mission to the European Union, Brussels, Belgium. For services to British foreign policy
 Michael Tatham — Deputy Head of Mission, Washington, United States of America. For services to British foreign policy
 Peter Tibber — lately HM Ambassador, Bogota, Colombia. For services to British foreign policy
 Emily Walter — Director General, Foreign, Commonwealth and Development Office. For services to British foreign policy
 Dr Glenn Webby — Deputy Director, Foreign, Commonwealth and Development Office. For services to national security

Royal Victorian Order

Knight/Dame Commander of the Royal Victorian Order (KCVO/DCVO)
 Vice Admiral Tony Johnstone-Burt, Master of the Household
 Jonathan Roger Weatherby, lately Her Majesty′s Representative's at Ascot

Commander of the Royal Victorian Order (CVO)
 Barbara Helen Kerry Francois, LVO, Director of Reservicing Operations, Master of the Household′s Department, Royal Household
 Jane Wendy Graham, LVO, Deputy Keeper of the Privy Purse
 Rear Admiral Michael Gregory, OBE, former Lord Lieutenant of Dunbartonshire
 Peter Thomas Marshall Hill, CB, for services to the Royal Household
 Carol Elizabeth Margaret Kinghorn, Lord Lieutenant of Kincardineshire
 Leonora Mary, Countess of Lichfield, LVO, Lady in Waiting to The Princess Royal
 Dr. Monica Maitland Main, Lord Lieutenant of Sutherland
 Araminta Mary Ritchie, LVO, Lady in Waiting to The Princess Royal
 Jane Mary Elizabeth Holderness-Roddam, CBE, LVO, Lady in Waiting to The Princess Royal
 Professor Sir David Philip Tweedie, Chairman, Audit, Risk and Compliance Committee, Royal Household

Lieutenant of the Royal Victorian Order (LVO)
 Steven Brian Davidson, MVO, Lately Horological Conservator, Royal Collection, Royal Household
 Dr. Grahame Clive Davies, Deputy Private Secretary to The Prince of Wales and The Duchess of Cornwall
 Stephen John Luke Davies, MVO, Lately Financial Controller, Duchy of Lancaster
 Ian Michael Grant, MVO, Acting Retail Director and Head of Product Development, Royal Collection, Royal Household
 Dr. Christopher Ian James Hartley. For services to The Duke of Edinburgh’s Commonwealth Study Conferences
 Professor Zygmunt Henderson Krukowski, Lately Surgeon to The Queen in Scotland
 Commander Stephen Patrick Lacey, RN, Lately Director of Operations, Royal Travel, Royal Household
 Amy Rachel Mayes, Lately Assistant Private Secretary to The Earl and Countess of Wessex
 Minal Patel, Financial Controller of Operations, Royal Household
Heather Lianne Salloum, Private Secretary to the Lieutenant Governor of Saskatchewan, Canada
Lieutenant Colonel John Cochrane Stewart, Lately Adjutant, The Queen’s Body Guard for Scotland, Royal Company of Archers
Lieutenant Colonel Robert Alastair Utten Todd, Private Secretary to The Duke and Duchess of Gloucester

Member of the Royal Victorian Order (MVO)
 Lee Anthony Baldock, RVM, Chauffeur, Household of The Prince of Wales and The Duchess of Cornwall
 Joseph Bradshaw. For services to the Buckinghamshire Lieutenancy
 Inspector David Andrew Breen, Metropolitan Police Service. For services to Royalty and Specialist Protection
 Stephanie Kathleen Carlton, Lately Conservation Survey Manager, Royal Collection, Royal Household
 Caroline Ann-Marie Clarke. For services to the Norfolk Lieutenancy
 Ronald James Hayward, RVM, Lately Chauffeur, Household of The Prince of Wales and The Duchess of Cornwall
 Clive Peter Hobbs, RVM, Valet, Household of The Prince of Wales and The Duchess of Cornwall
 William Glyn Jones, Head Ranger, Balmoral Estate.
 Catherine Mary Leonard, Data Protection Manager, Royal Household.
 Stephen Matthew Murray, RVM, Yeoman of the Plate Pantry, Master of the Household’s Department, Royal Household.
 Inspector Ann-Marie Nesling, Metropolitan Police Service. For services to Royalty and Specialist Protection
 Stephen Mark Niedojadlo, RVM, The Duke of Edinburgh’s Page.
 Cameron Duncan Ormiston, Stock Manager, Balmoral Estate
 Sylvia Battenberg Ormiston, Pony Stud Manager, Balmoral Estate
 Professor Emeritus Roger James Taylor. For services to the Royal Collection
 Lucy Elizabeth Thorn, Interim Head of Finance, Household of The Duke and Duchess of Cambridge

Honorary
 Catharina Maria Coppens, Saddler and Harness Maker, Royal Mews, Royal Household
 Elena-Corina Motoc. For services to The Prince of Wales in Romania

Royal Victorian Medal (RVM)

Royal Victorian Medal (Gold)
 Adrian John Denman, MVO, RVM, Lately Head Gardener, Royal Gardens, Windsor Castle

Bar to the Royal Victorian Medal (Silver)
 Kevin William Haylor, RVM, Lately Tractor and Machinery Operator, Crown Estate, Windsor
 Michael Alan Edward Robinson, RVM, Lately Purchasing Supervisor, Crown Estate, Windsor
 Mark Welsford, RVM, Lately Team Supervisor, Parks Department, Crown Estate, Windsor

Royal Victorian Medal (Silver)
 Sarah Louise Bailey, General Catering Assistant, Royal Household
 Derek Alexander Webster Dewar, Fire and Security Office Team Leader, Palace of Holyroodhouse
 Victor Robert Fisher, Lately Divisional Sergeant Major, The Queen's Body Guard of the Yeomen of the Guard
 Stephen Frogatt, Yeoman Warder, Her Majesty’s Tower of London
 Alison Aitkenhead Gove, Retail and Admissions Assistant, Palace of Holyroodhouse
 Keith William Hanson, Lately Yeoman, The Queen's Body Guard of the Yeomen of the Guard
 Andrea Rose Marie Lopez, Assistant to the House Manager, Clarence House
 Sandra Okorefe-Onwone, Assistant to the House Manager, Clarence House
 Timothy Ian Reeves, Gardens Team Leader, Sandringham House
 Colin Smith, MBE, BEM, Yeoman Warder, Her Majesty’s Tower of London
 Gary William Taylor, Lately Carpenter, Crown Estate, Windsor

Order of the British Empire

Knight/Dame Commander of the Order of the British Empire (KBE/DBE) 
 Military
 Civil
 Mary Rosa Alleyne Berry CBE — For services to Broadcasting, the Culinary Arts and charity
 Professor Muffy Calder OBE FRSE FREng — Vice Principal and Head, College of Science and Engineering, University of Glasgow. For services to Research and Education
 Siobhan Davies CBE — Choreographer. For services to Dance
 Dr Clare Gerada MBE — Medical Director, NHS Practitioner Health Programme and General Practitioner, Hurley Group Practice. For services to General Practice
 Victoria Mary Taylor Heywood CBE — Lately Chair, Royal Society of Arts. For services to the Arts
 Susan Hill CBE — For services to Literature
 Elaine Inglesby-Burke CBE — Chief Nursing Officer, Northern Care Alliance NHS Group. For services to Nursing
 Maureen Diane Lipman CBE — Actress. For services to charity, Entertainment and the Arts
 Linda Pollard CBE DL — Chair, Leeds Teaching Hospital NHS Trust. For services to Healthcare and the community in Northern England
 Professor Anne Marie Rafferty CBE — Professor of Nursing Policy, King's College London and President, Royal College of Nursing. For services to Nursing
 Emma Natasha Walmsley — Chief Executive Officer, GlaxoSmithKline. For services to the Pharmaceutical Industry and Business
 Professor Sarah Elizabeth Worthington QC (Hon) FBA — Downing Professor of the Laws of England, University of Cambridge. For services to English Private Law

 Honorary

Commander of the Order of the British Empire (CBE) 
 Military
 Commodore James Miles Benjamin Parkin
 Commodore James Le Seelleur Perks, OBE
 Brigadier Christopher Matthew Balmer Coles
 Colonel Charles Richard Patrick Ginn
 Colonel Andrew Nicholas Szabo
 Brigadier Neil Bryan Thorpe, OBE
 Brigadier William Stewart Codrington Wright, OBE
 Air Commodore Paul Harron Lloyd
 Air Vice-Marshal Christopher John Moore
 Air 3
 Group Captain Daniel Joseph Startup
 Air Commodore Ian Jon Townsend

 Civil
 Kofi Gyasi Adjepong-Boateng — Chair, Economic Justice Programme, Open Society Foundations. For services to Philanthropy
 Caroline Jane Alexander — Chief Nurse, Barts Health NHS Trust. For services to Nursing
 Joan Anita Barbara Armatrading MBE — Singer, Songwriter and Guitarist. For services to Music, charity and Equal Rights
 Jean Margaret Ashton OBE — Lately Director, Business Services and Operations, Crown Prosecution Service. For services to Law and Order
 Jane Victoria Atkinson FREng — Executive Director, Engineering and Automation, Bilfinger UK. For services to Chemical Engineering
 Suzanne Margaret Eunice Banks — Lately Chief Nurse, Sherwood Forest Hospitals NHS Foundation Trust. For services to Nursing in the NHS
 Peter Barnett — Lead Officer, Refugee Resettlement, Coventry City Council. For services to Refugees in Coventry
 William Bingham Barnett — Chief Executive, W&R Barnett Ltd. For services to Economic Development in Northern Ireland
 Margaret Eleanor Baxter OBE — Chair of Trustees, Womankind. For services to Gender Equality in the UK and Abroad
 Karen Bennett — Chief Executive Officer, Enterprise Credit Union. For services to the Credit Union Sector and Financial Inclusion
 Professor Gwenda Lynne Berry OBE — Lately Chair, Breast Cancer Now and Chair, Human Tissue Authority. For services to Civil Society and charity
 Farmida Bi — Chair, Norton Rose Fulbright (Europe, Middle East and Asia). For services to Law and charity
 Katharine Birbalsingh — Founder and Headmistress, Michaela Community School. For services to Education
 Anthony Mark Boyle — Non-Executive Chair, The Pensions Regulator. For services to the Pensions Industry
 Jacqueline Anne Brock-Doyle OBE — Executive Director, Communications, World Athletics. For services to Sport
 Michael William Tuke Brown MVO — Commissioner, Transport for London. For services to Transport
 Desmond John Michael Browne QC — Barrister. For services to the Inns of Court and Diversity at the Bar.
 Anne Bulford OBE — For services to Broadcasting and charity
 Simon Alexander Carr — Managing Director, Henry Boot Construction. For services to the Construction Industry and charity
 Matthew Carter — For services to Typography and Design
 Emma Jane Churchill — Head of Border Delivery Group, Cabinet Office. For Public services
 Cecile Yvonne Conolly — Former Headteacher. For services to Education
 Professor Brian Edward Cox OBE FRS — Professor of Particle Physics, University of Manchester. For services to the Promotion of Science
 Jeremy Cox — Executive Chair, Bermuda Monetary Authority, Bermuda. For services to the economy of Bermuda
 Judy Sarah Jarman Craymer MBE — For services to Theatre and charity
 Mary Elizabeth Curnock Cook OBE — Educationalist. For services to Further and Higher Education
 Linda Margaret Dann — Lately Head, European Bilateral Relations and EU Exit, Ministry of Defence. For services to International Relations
 Jonathan David Douglas — Chief Executive, National Literacy Trust. For services to Education
 Antony Eastaugh — Director, Immigration Enforcement, Home Office. For services to Law and Order
 Joanna Elson OBE — Chief Executive, Money Advice Trust. For services to People in Financial Difficulty
 Michael Benedict Emmerson — International Lawyer. For services to international human rights and humanitarian law
 Rebecca Ann Evans — For services to the Arts in Wales.
 Professor Amelia Fletcher OBE — Lately Non-Executive Board Member, Financial Conduct Authority and Payment Systems Regulator. For services to the Economy
 Richard David Flint — Lately Chief Executive, Yorkshire Water. For services to the Water Industry and the Environment
 Martin Frost — Co-Founder and Director, CMR Surgical. For services to Robotics
 Olivia Ruth Garfield — Chief Executive Officer, Severn Trent. For services to the Water Industry
 Warren David Gatland OBE — Lately Head Coach, Welsh Rugby Union. For services to Rugby in Wales
 Julia Caroline Gault — Head, Family, Poverty and In Work Progression Policy, Department for Work and Pensions. For public service and for services to the community in Mitcham
 Richard Gill — Chief Executive Officer, Arthur Terry Learning Partnership. For services to Education
 Richard William Gleave OBE — Ballroom Dancer. For services to Dance
 Jeffrey Charles Godfrey — Director of Legal Services, Welsh Government. For services to Devolution and the Legislative Process in Wales
 Dr Kim Sara Golding — Consultant Clinical Psychologist. For services to Children and Young People
 Johanna Clare Lindsay Harston — Deputy Director, HM Treasury. For public service
 Professor Keith Edward Hawton — Consultant Psychiatrist, Oxford Health NHS Foundation Trust and Professor of Psychiatry, University of Oxford. For services to Suicide Prevention
 Professor Anthony Edward Hill OBE — Executive Director, National Oceanography Centre. For services to Ocean and Environmental Science
 Kelly Hoppen MBE — Interior Designer and Entrepreneur. For services to the GREAT campaign
 Zuber Vali Issa — Co-Founder, EG Group. For services to Business and charity
 Mohsin Issa — Co-Founder EG Group. For services to Business and charity
 Christopher Jones — Larely Chief Executive, Dwr Cymru Welsh Water. For services to the Water Industry in England and Wales
 Dr George Kassianos — National Immunisation Lead, Royal College of General Practitioners. For services to Travel Medicine and General Practice
 Adriénne Kelbie — Chief Executive, Office for Nuclear Regulation. For services to the Nuclear Industry and to Diversity and Inclusion
 Lorraine Kelly OBE — Television Presenter. For services to Broadcasting, Journalism and charity
 Rosaleen Clare Kerslake OBE — Chief Executive, National Lottery Heritage Fund. For services to Heritage
 Mohammed Khan OBE — Leader, Blackburn with Darwen Council. For services to Local Government
 Nicolette King OBE — Lately Chair, Greenacre Academy Trust. For services to Education
 Robin Ann Lawther — Non-Executive Director, UK Government Investments. For services to Diversity and the Finance Industry
 Adrian Anthony Lester OBE — Actor. For services to Drama
 Niall Richard Mackenzie — Director, Infrastructure and Materials, Department for Business, Energy and Industrial Strategy. For services to Business and Industry
 Anne Margaret Main — Lately Member of Parliament for St Albans. For public and parliamentary service
 Professor Yadvinder Singh Malhi FRS — Professor of Ecosystem Science, University of Oxford. For services to Ecosystem Science
 Dr John David Gibson Mcadam — Chair, United Utilities Plc and Rentokil Initial Plc. For services to Business
 Maria Mcgill — Lately Chief Executive, Children's Hospices Across Scotland. For services to Palliative Care and charity
 Amanda Jane Melton — For services to Further Education
 Dr Deborah Catherine Morgan — Director, Primary Mathematics, National Centre for Excellence in Teaching Mathematics. For services to Education
 Jasper Morrison — Founder, Jasper Morrison Ltd and co-originator of the Super Normal design manifesto. For services to Design
 Professor Sa'Id Mosteshar — Director, London Institute of Space Policy and Law. For services to Space Law and Policy
 Theresa Ojo — Chief Executive, The Diana Award. For services to Young People
 Dr Ighayezomo Philip Orumwense — Lately Head of Applications, Programmes and Platforms, Commercial Directorate, Department for Work and Pensions. For public service
 Adrian Humphrey Austen Osborn — Philanthropist. For services to Education, the Arts and charity
 Neeta Patel — For services to Entrepreneurship and Technology
 Stuart Thomas Payne — Director, Supply Chain, Decommissioning and HR, Oil and Gas Authority. For services to the Oil and Gas Sector
 Richard John Pennycook — Co-Chair, British Retail Consortium. For services to Retail
 Nathan James Phillips — Lately Director, Department for Exiting the European Union. For services to Government and the Economy
 Alexander James Pienaar — Deputy Director, Northern Ireland and Negotiations, HM Revenue and Customs. For public service
 Karen Emma Pollock MBE — Chief Executive, Holocaust Educational Trust. For services to Holocaust Education
 Nicholas Mark Price — Deputy Director, Operations, Government Legal Department. For public service and for services to Diversity and Inclusion
 Samuel Alan Miles Rayner DL — Chairman, Lakeland Ltd. For services to Business and the community in Cumbria
 Lady Ruth Rogers MBE — Co-Founder, The River Cafe. For services to the Culinary Arts and charity
 Simon Gerald Routh-Jones QFSM — HM Chief Inspector, Scottish Fire and Rescue Service. For services to the Fire and Rescue Service
 Professor Sophie Kerttu Scott — Professor of Cognitive Neuroscience, University College London. For services to Neuroscience
 Robert Mark Greenhill Semple OBE — Lately Chairman, National Conservative Convention. For political service
 Siobhan Sheridan — Civilian HR Director, Ministry of Defence. For services to Ministry of Defence Personnel
 Paulette Simpson — Deputy Chair, Windrush Commemoration Committee. For services to the Caribbean community in the UK
 Matthew Smith — Chief Executive Officer, The Key Fund. For services to Social Investment
 Gareth Thomas — For services to Sport and Health
 Professor Patricia Thompson — Philanthropist. For charitable services
 David Brian Thompson — Philanthropist. For charitable services
 Linda Tomos — Librarian, National Library of Wales. For services to Welsh Culture
 Joseph Michael Tuke — Director, Local Government and Communities, Ministry for Housing, Communities and Local Government. For public service
 Dr Gillian Tully — Forensic Science Regulator. For services to Forensic Science
 Christiaan Richard David Van Der Kuyl FRSE — Chair and Co-Founder, 4J Studios. For services to the Economy
 Dr Frances Mary Walker — Artist and Printmaker. For services to Scottish Art
 Robin Watson — Chief Executive Officer, Wood Plc. For services to International Trade
 Professor David John Webb FRSE — Christison Professor of Therapeutics and Clinical Pharmacology, University of Edinburgh. For services to Clinical Pharmacology Research and Education
 Robert Webster — Chief Executive, South West Yorkshire Partnership NHS Foundation Trust. For services to Healthcare Leadership
 Professor Michael Alun West — Professor of Work and Organisational Psychology, Lancaster University. For services to Compassion and Innovation in the NHS
 Susan Whiddington — Founding Director, Mousetrap Theatre Projects. For services to Young People
 Robin Wight CVO — For services to Diversity in the Creative Industries
 Ansel Keith David Wong — For services to Arts and Culture
 Clare Eleanor Woodman — Head of EMEA, Morgan Stanley and Chief Executive Officer, Morgan Stanley & Co International Plc. For services to Finance

 Honorary

Officer of the Order of the British Empire (OBE) 
 Military
 Commodore Robert James Anstey
 Commodore Paul Christopher Carroll
 Lieutenant Colonel (Acting Colonel) Michael Andrew Geldard. Royal Marines
 Captain Kevin Massie Noakes
 Lieutenant Colonel Hugh Ashley Philip Amos. Intelligence Corps
 Lieutenant Colonel Peter William Stanhope Baines, MBE. The Rifles
 Lieutenant Colonel Debra Jane Blackman. Intelligence Corps
 Lieutenant Colonel Alexander Vaughan Cooper, MBE. The Royal Regiment of Scotland
 Lieutenant Colonel Alex Richard Forsyth. The Royal Regiment of Scotland
 Colonel Ian Paul Gibson.
 Lieutenant Colonel John Harvey. Adjutant General's Corps (Royal Military Police)
 Lieutenant Colonel Christopher David Damien O'Halloran. Royal Regiment of Artillery
 Lieutenant Colonel Robert Balfour Poole. Royal Army Medical Corps
 Acting Colonel Clinton Mark Riley. Army Cadet Force
 Lieutenant Colonel James Samuel Skelton, MBE. The Royal Regiment of Fusiliers
 Group Captain Chantal Emma Baker
 Group Captain John Ronald Butcher
 Group Captain Mason Clark Fenlon
 Wing Commander Nicholas Donald Charles Green
 Group Captain Sonia Margaret Phythian, ARRC. Princess Mary's Royal Air Force Nursing Service
 Group Captain Ian James Sharrocks
 Surgeon Commander Sam David Hutchings
 Lieutenant Colonel Timothy John Brent
 Lieutenant Colonel Simon Thomas Horne

 Civil
 Professor Ramesh Pulendran Arasaradnam — Consultant Gastroenterologist, University Hospitals Coventry and Warwickshire NHS Trust. For services to the NHS during Covid-19
 Dr Daren James Austin — Senior Fellow, GlaxoSmithKline. For services to Emergency Response during Covid-19
 Graham Barrett — Governing Governor, Her Majesty's Prison Wandsworth. For services to Her Majesty's Prison and Probation Service during Covid-19
 Lauren Jayne Batey — For services to the Protection of Vulnerable Children during Covid-19
 Tamsin Berry — Lately Director, Department of Health and Social Care. For services to Government and Life Sciences
 Dabirul Islam Choudhury — For charitable service during Covid-19
 Dr Ian Collard — lately Head of Counter-Terrorism Department, Foreign and Commonwealth Office. For services to British foreign policy and to national security
 Dr Antony Vivian Cox — Chief Executive Officer, UK BIOCentre. For services to Science and the Covid-19 response
 John Coyle — Chairman RNLI (Ireland), Trustee, RNLI (UK) and Chairman, Commissioners of Irish Lights. For services to the Royal National Lifeboat Institution, the Irish Lights and to UK/Republic of Ireland relations
 Fiona Danks — Head, Centenary Commemorations, Foreign, Commonwealth and Development Office. For services to national security
 Dr Rachael Dorothy Devlin — Group Medical Director, Health Services Laboratories and The Doctors Laboratory and Vice President of the Royal College of Pathologists. For services to Pathology during the Covid-19 response.
 Anne Donaghy — For services to Local Government and the community in County Antrim during Covid-19
 Susan Marie Doolan — Lately Governor, Her Majesty's Prison Littlehey. For services to Her Majesty's Prison and Probation Service during Covid-19
 Emma Jane Easton — Head of Voluntary Partnerships, NHS England. For services to Voluntary Healthcare during Covid-19
 Dr Rebecca Edwards — Chief Medical Officer, Falkland Islands. For services to the Falkland Islands Community
 Gaynor Susan Jean Evans — Infection, Prevention and Control Lead, NHS. For services to Infection Prevention during Covid-19
 Phillip John Charles Garrigan — Chief Fire Officer, Merseyside Fire and Rescue Service. For services to Fire and Rescue during Covid-19
 Bernhard Garside — lately HM Ambassador, San Salvador, El Salvador. For services to British foreign policy
 Ali Ghorbangholi — Co-Founder and Director of GoodSam. For services to Volunteering during the Covid-19 response
 Christopher Gillon — Team Leader, Strategic Threats Team, Foreign, Commonwealth and Development Office. For services to national security
 Israel Gloger — Director, Trust in Science Initiative. For services to UK/Argentina scientific relations
 Professor Julia Gog — Professor of Mathematical Biology, University of Cambridge and Fellow, Queens' College, Cambridge. For services to Academia and the Covid-19 response
 Cathryn Graham — Director of Music at the British Council. For services to music and to UK cultural relations
 Carl David Hardwick — Governor Her Majesty's Prison/Youth Offenders Institution Drake Hall. For services to Her Majesty's Prison and Probation Service and Women in Custody during Covid-19.
 Professor Andrew Harrison — Chief Executive Officer, Diamond Light Source Ltd. For services to Science during the Covid-19 response
 Matthew David Hood — Principal, Oak National Academy, London. For services to Education during Covid-19
 Philip Hoper — Head, Special Projects Team, Foreign, Commonwealth and Development Office. For services to national security
 Felicia Margaret Kwaku — Associate Director of Nursing, King's College NHS Foundation Trust. For services to Nursing during Covid-19
 Jan Latham Koenig — Chief Conductor, Novaya Opera, Moscow, Russia. For services to music and to UK/Russia cultural relations
 Dr Michael John Lee — Chief Medical Officer, Cayman Islands.  For services to health
 Ashleigh Louise Linsdell — Founder and Coordinator, For the Love of Scrubs. For services to the NHS during the Covid-19 response
 Jeff Lynne — Musician. For services to music
 Dr Derek John Maguire — For services to Dentistry and the Covid-19 response
 Dr James Spencer Marshall — Operations Lead, Water UK. For services to the Water Sector during the Covid-19 response
 Robert Mathavious — Managing Director and Chief Executive Officer, BVI Financial Services Commission, British Virgin Islands. For services to the British Virgin Islands and to financial services
 Dr Conall Padraig Joseph McCaughey — Consultant Virologist, Belfast HSC Trust. For services to Laboratory Testing during Covid-19
 David Alexander Wilson McCredie — Chief Executive Officer, Australian British Chamber of Commerce, Sydney, Australia. For services to international trade and UK/Australia relations
 Dr Sarah Elizabeth McDonald — Biobank Manager, Medical Research Council, University of Glasgow Centre for Virus Research. For services to the Covid-19 response
 Professor Graham Francis Hassell Medley — Professor of Infectious Disease Modelling, London School of Hygiene and Tropical Medicine. For services to the Covid-19 response
 Kathleen Mohan — Chief Executive Officer, Housing Justice. For services to Vulnerable People during Covid-19
 Professor Catherine Jane Noakes — Professor of Environmental Engineering for Buildings, University of Leeds. For services to the Covid-19 response
 Ruiari O'Connell — lately HM Ambassador, Pristina, Kosovo. For services to British foreign policy
 Ndidi Okezie — Chief Executive Officer, UK Youth. For services to Young People during the Covid-19 response
 Sacha Veronica Pemberthy — Chief Executive Officer, Fair4All Finance. For services to Business during the Covid-19 response
 Francesca Elizabeth Sainsbury Perrin — Philanthropist and Founder, Indigo Trust. For charitable service particularly during Covid-19
 Adrian James Petticrew — For services to St John Ambulance (Northern Ireland) during the Covid-19 response
 Dr Alison Jane Pittard — Dean, The Faculty of Intensive Care Medicine. For services to Critical Care particularly during Covid-19
 Susan Pullen MBE — former Falkland Islands Representative in London. For services to the people of the Falkland Islands
 Jane Chantal Rickards — Chief Executive Officer, British Academy of Film and Television Arts Los Angeles, United States of America. For services to broadcasting and charity
 Anthony Ridout — Team Leader, Foreign, Commonwealth and Development Office. For services to British foreign policy
 Dr Gideon James Rubin — Assistant Director, Health Protection Research Unit for Emergency Preparedness and Response, King's College London. For services to Public Health particularly during Covid-19
 Professor Malcolm Gracie Semple — Professor of Child Health and Outbreak Medicine, University of Liverpool and Consultant Respiratory Paediatrician, Alder Hey Children's Hospital. For services to the Covid-19 response
 Carol Ann Shanahan — Founder and Trustee, The Hubb Foundation. For services to the community in Stoke-on-Trent during the Covid-19 response
 Dr Ian Singleton — Director of Conservation, PanEco Foundation/Sumatran Orangutan Conservation Programme, Indonesia. For services to the environment and conservation
 Professor Timothy David Spector — Professor of Genetic Epidemiology, King's College London. For services to the Covid-19 response
 Ganeshalingam Suntharalingam — President, Intensive Care Society & Consultant, London North West University Healthcare. For services to the NHS during Covid-19
 Suzanne Nicola Sweeney — Network Lead, London Neonatal Network and Area Chair, Sea Cadets. For services to Neonatal Provision in the NHS and to the Sea Cadets particularly during Covid-19
 James Taylor — Group Leader, Defence Science and Technology Laboratory. For services to the NHS during Covid-19
 Adam Tee — Team Leader, Foreign, Commonwealth and Development Office. For services to British foreign policy
 David Mark Thomas — Principal, Jane Austen College and Curriculum Lead, Oak National Academy. For services to Education particularly during Covid-19
 Professor Emma Thomson — Professor of Infectious Diseases and Consultant Virologist, University of Glasgow Centre for Virus Research. For services to the NHS during the Covid-19 response
 Emer Timmons — former President, Strategic Deals and Customer Engagement, BT Global Services UK. For services to Women and to Equality
 Dr John Walker — lately Head, Arms Control & Disarmament Research, Foreign and Commonwealth Office. For services to British foreign policy
 Professor Ann Sarah Walker — Professor, University of Oxford and University College London. For services to Academia and the Covid-19 response
 Susan Mary Williams — Matron, Royal Hospital Chelsea. For services to Patients during the Covid-19 response
 Professor Mark Howard Wilson — Co-founder and Director of GoodSAM. For services to charity and the Covid-19 response
 Laura Winningham — Chief Executive Officer, City Harvest London. For services to the community in London during the Covid-19 response
 Philip Wood — President of British New Zealand Business Association, Wellington, New Zealand. For services to British business in New Zealand
 Professor Lucy Yardley — Professor of Health Psychology, University of Bristol and University of Southampton. For services to the Covid-19 response
 Dr Jeffrey Adams — Section Head, Forensic Science Regulation Unit, Home Office. For services to Forensic Science
 Abu Ahmed — Head, Local Delivery and Communications, Office for Security and Counter Terrorism, Home Office. For public service
 John Mark Ainsley — Operatic Tenor. For services to Music
 Caron Andrea Alexander — Lately Director, Digital Shared Services, Grade 5, Department of Finance. For services to Government and the IT industry in Northern Ireland
 Geraldine Allinson — For services to Local Media in Kent
 Christopher Armitt QPM — Deputy Chief Constable, Civil Nuclear Constabulary. For services to the Civil and Nuclear Industry
 Charles Albert Armstrong — Chief Executive, Scottish Fishermen's Federation. For services to the British Fishing Industry
 Christopher Richard Thompson Askew — Chief Executive, Diabetes UK. For services to People with Diabetes
 Catherine Jane Atkinson — Data Science Team Leader, Department for Business, Energy and Industrial Strategy. For services to Data Science
 Ayodele Idowu Awoyungbo — Senior Crown Prosecutor, International Unit, Crown Prosecution Service. For services to Law and Order
 Joshua Thomas Aderele Babarinde — Founder and Chief Executive Officer, Cracked It. For services to Criminal Justice, Social Enterprise and the Economy
 Steven Baker — Executive Headteacher, Aspire Schools Federation. For services to Education
 David Ball — Chair of Trustees, Rosemary Appeal. For voluntary and charitable services
 David John Bamford — Lately Governor, HM Prison Brixton. For services to HM Prison and Probation Service
 Paul Frederick Barry-Walsh — For services to Enterprise and charity
 Johnathan Bates — Analytical Team Leader, Department of Health and Social Care. For public service
 Kevin John Baughan — Lately Deputy Chief Executive Officer, Innovate UK. For services to Innovation and Skills Development
 Sarah Frances (Sally) Beamish FRSE — Composer. For services to Music
 Caroline Wynne Beasley-Murray JP — HM Senior Coroner for Essex. For services HM Coroners' Service
 Hazel Ruth Bell — Chair, Choice Housing Ireland Limited. For services to Social Housing in Northern Ireland
 Kate Rachel Bennett — Lately Senior Private Secretary, Department for Exiting the EU. For public service
 Professor Debra Elizabeth Bick — Professor of Clinical Trials in Maternal Health, University of Warwick. For services to Midwifery
 Lilian Clara Alexandra Black — Chair, Holocaust Survivors Friendship Association. For services to Holocaust Education
 Philipa Bragman — Founder and lately Director, CHANGE. For services to People with Learning Disabilities
 Gordon Wilson Bridge — For services to the community in South Yorkshire
 Sandy Brown — National Leader of Education. For services to Education
 Emma Victoria Burgess — Senior Lawyer, Ministry of Justice Legal Team, Government Legal Department. For services to International Relations
 Barbara Bush — Lately HR Director, The Pensions Regulator. For services to the Pensions Industry, Diversity and charity
 Alexander Campbell — Chief Executive, Queen Victoria Seamen's Rest. For services to charity
 Peter Cardy — For services to the community in Gosport, Hampshire
 James Carpy — Head, Iraq Team, Department for International Development. For services to International Development in Iraq
 Carol Anne Carson — Volunteer Nurse, Voluntary Service Overseas. For services to Healthcare
 Dr Deesha Chadha — Co-Chair, Faiths Forum for London. For services to Faith communities
 Herminder Kaur Channa JP — Principal, Ark Boulton Academy. For services to Education
 Adrienne Pamela Cherrywood — Founder and Headteacher, Cressey College, Croydon. For services to Children and Young People with Special Educational Needs and Disabilities
 Yasmine Chinwala — Partner, New Financial, HM Treasury. For services to the HM Treasury Women in Finance Charter
 Patricia Ann Chrimes — Chair, Royal British Legion Women's Section. For services to Ex-Service Personnel
 Professor Marta Cecilia Cohen — Clinical Director, Pharmacy Diagnostics and Genetics and Head, Histopathology Department, Sheffield Children's NHS Foundation Trust. For services to the Treatment of Sudden Infant Death Syndrome
 Richard David Collier-Keywood — Chair of the Board, School for Social Entrepreneurs. For services to Social Enterprise
 John Kevin Connolly — For services to Renal Transplantation in Northern Ireland
 Mary Louise Contini — For services to the Scottish Food Industry and Scottish-Italian Relations
 Shirley Cooper — For services to Equality, Women's Empowerment and Procurement
 Paulette Cope — Project Manager, Phoenix II, Land Equipment, Ministry of Defence. For services to Ministry of Defence
 Deborah Samantha Cropanese — Delivery Director, National Business Centres, HM Courts and Tribunals Service. For public service
 Carol Ann Culley — Deputy Chief Executive and City Treasurer, Manchester City Council. For services to Local Government
 John Morgan D'Arcy — National Director, Open University. For services to Education and the Arts
 Lyn Dance — Headteacher, The Milestone School and Chief Executive Officer, SAND Academies Trust. For services to Education
 Professor Nicholas Daniel — Oboist. For services to Music
 Professor Gail Davey — Professor of Global Health Epidemiology, Brighton and Sussex Medical School. For services to tackling Neglected Tropical Diseases
 Professor Julia Claire Davidson — Director, Online Harms and Cyber Crime Unit, University of East London. For services to Online Safety
 Professor Jennifer Catriona Davidson — For services to the Care and Protection of Children and Young People in Scotland and Abroad
 Timothy James Dawson — Chief Executive Officer, SkyDemon. For services to Aviation Safety
 Ian Edwin Dilks — Chair, NHS Resolution. For services to the NHS
 John Aloysius Docherty — Headteacher, St Ninian's High School, East Renfrewshire. For services to Education
 Melanie Doel (Melanie Davies) — For services to Journalism, charity and the community in Wales
 Thomas Matthew Innes Drew — Head, Data and Innovation, Office for Security and Counter Terrorism, Home Office. For public service
 Rosemary Ann Drinkwater — For services to Higher Education, Innovation and Enterprise in the West Midlands
 Mark William Dudfield — Project Lead, Illuminate, HM Revenue and Customs. For public service
 Graham John Duxbury — Chief Executive, Groundwork UK. For services to Communities and the Environment in the UK
 Roland Rennie Alistair Eadie — For services to the community in County Fermanagh
 Carolann Edwards — For services to Disadvantaged People in the UK and South Africa
 Mark Timothy Jon Enzer — Chair, Digital Framework Task Group and Chief Technical Officer, Mott MacDonald. For services to the National Infrastructure
 Christopher Martin Evans — Constructive Engineer, Ministry of Defence. For services to Naval Engineering
 David Evans — Member, Flintshire Council. For public service
 Bernardine Anne Mobolaji Evaristo MBE — Author. For services to Literature
 Shaun Alan Fenton — Headteacher, Reigate Grammar School, Surrey. For services to Education
 Jacqueline Ruth Findlay — Lately Regional Tribunal Judge, HM Courts and Tribunals Service. For services to the Administration of Justice
 Hedley John Finn MBE — Founder, Radio Lollipop International. For services to Children in Hospital
 Colin Flack — Lately Chair, Rail Alliance. For services to the Rail Supply Industry
 Jacqueline Fletcher — Senior Nurse Advisor, Stop the Pressure Programme, NHS England and NHS Improvement. For services to Wound Care Management
 Richard Forsyth — Chair, Forsyth's Ltd. For services to the Distillation and Oil and Gas Industries and the community in Speyside, Scottish Highlands
 Marie Gentles — Lately Headteacher, Hawkswood Primary Pupil Referral Unit, London. For services to Education
 Professor Christianne Glossop — Chief Veterinary Officer for Wales. For services to Animal Health and Welfare
 Marcella Goligher-Martin — Governor, HM Prison Humber. For services to Criminal Justice
 Professor Cathy Gormley-Heenan — Deputy Vice-Chancellor (Research and Impact), Ulster University. For services to Higher Education
 Professor Stephen John Haake — Professor of Sports Engineering, Sheffield Hallam University. For services to Sport
 Gareth Morgan Hadley — Chair, General Optical Council. For services to the Optical Sector
 Daniel Hahn — For services to Literature
 Max William Von Furer Haimendorf — Principal, Ark King Solomon Academy, Westminster. For services to Education
 Pamela Theresa Hall — President, National Conservative Convention. For public and political service
 Charles Graham Hammond — For services to the UK Ports Industry and Business in Scotland
 Dominique Marie Hardy — Lately Regional Director, Asia-Pacific, UK Visas and Immigration, Home Office. For public service
 Michael Ross Harris — Trustee and Treasurer, Comic Relief. For voluntary and charitable services
 Fiona Harrison — Intelligence Analyst, Risk and Intelligence Services, HM Revenue and Customs. For services to Tackling Fraud
 Anthony Peter Hatch — For services to Music and charity
 Richard Charles Hawkes — Chief Executive, British Asian Trust. For services to the Charitable Sector
 David George Heeley — For services to Charitable Fundraising
 Dr Grahaeme Henderson — For services to the International Shipping Industry
 Christopher James Hindley — Chief Executive, Youth Fed. For services to Young People in North West England
 Caroline Hoddinott — Lately Executive Headteacher, Haybridge School and Sixth Form, Hagley. For services to Education
 Dr Lesley Karen Holdsworth — Physiotherapist and National Clinical Lead for Digital Health and Care, Scottish Government and Glasgow Caledonian University. For services to Physiotherapy and Health Services
 David Samuel John Holmes — Manufacturing Director, BAE Systems Air Sector. For services to Aerospace Manufacturing
 Lee Thomas Howell QFSM — Chief Fire Officer, Devon and Somerset Fire and Rescue Service. For services to the Fire and Rescue Service
 Muhammad Naveed Idrees — Headteacher, Feversham Primary Academy, Bradford. For services to Education
 Julie Deborah Iles — President, Conservative Women's Organisation. For public and political service
 Georgina Kate Jackson — Development Director, Sold Out. For services to Education and Diversity in the Video Games Industry
 Danny Jeyasingam — For services to Governance and Devolution
 Anita Johnson — Headteacher, Loxford School of Science and Technology and Chief Executive Officer, Loxford School Trust. For services to Education
 Stephen Martin Johnston — Economic Adviser, Trade Remedies and Disputes, Department for International Trade. For services to International Trade
 Fiona Jane Jones — Universal Credit Group Director for Wales and Lead, National Employer and Partnership Team, Work and Health Services, Department for Work and Pensions. For services to Unemployed People in Wales
 Jonathon Glyn Jones — Managing Director of Trading, Tregothnan. For services to International Trade and Commerce
 Kim Niklas Jones — Fashion Designer, Christian Dior. For services to Fashion
 Alun Wyn Jones — For services to Rugby Union Football in Wales
 Natalie Claire Constance Jones — Delivery Director, EU Exit Programme, Home Office. For public service
 Rick Jones — Team Leader, Ministry of Defence. For services to Defence
 Allison Mackie Kennedy — Headteacher, Knightsridge Primary School, Livingston. For services to Education in West Lothian
 Jane Hope Kennedy — Architect, Purcell UK. For services to Conservation Architecture
 Richard Kenney — President, Commonwealth Judo Association. For services to Judo
 Laura Kiddoo — Senior Policy Adviser, HM Treasury. For services to EU Exit
 Samantha Clare King — Manager, Marine Environment, Natural England. For services to Marine Conservation
 Professor Charles James Knight — Chief Executive, St Bartholomew's Hospital, Clinical Director and Consultant Cardiologist, Barts Health NHS Trust. For services to the NHS and People with Heart Disease
 Paul Anthony Lee DL — Chairman, Horserace Betting Levy Board. For services to Horse Racing
 Professor Cheryl Ann Lenney — Chief Nurse, Manchester University NHS Foundation Trust. For services to Nursing and Midwifery
 Professor Jason Anthony Lowe — Head, Climate Services for Government, Meteorological Office. For services to Climate Science
 Nigel Lugg — Chairman, UK Fashion and Textiles Association. For services to the Fashion and Textiles Industries
 Juliet Madeline Mabey — Publisher. For services to Publishing
 Neil Andrew Macdonald — Pro Chancellor, Sheffield Hallam University. For services to Education and Business
 Kirsten Nicola Mackey — Managing Director, Citizenship and Consumer Affairs, Barclays UK. For services to Financial Services and Young People
 Ian Marcus — Commissioner, Crown Estate. For service to the Economy
 Olivia Ruth Marks-Woldman — Chief Executive, Holocaust Memorial Day Trust. For services to Holocaust and Genocide Education and Commemoration
 Dr Carol Marsh — Deputy Head of Electronics Engineering, Leonardo. For services to Diversity and Inclusion in Electronic Engineering
 Sally Margaret Mcgregor (Grantham Mcgregor) — Emeritus Professor of Child Health and Nutrition, Institute of Child Health, University College London. For services to Early Childhood Development in Developing Countries
 Dr Lucy Katrina Mcleay — Programme Director, Euratom Exit Programme, Department for Business, Energy and Industrial Strategy. For services to Energy Policy
 Alan Mcrae — Lately President, Scottish Football Association. For services to Grassroots and Professional Football
 Clive Allan James Memmott — Chief Executive, Greater Manchester Chamber of Commerce and lately Non-Executive Director, British Chambers of Commerce. For services to Business
 Professor Paul Meredith — Senior Cymru Professor in Sustained Advanced Materials, Swansea University. For services to Semiconductor Research and Innovation
 Rabbi David Meyer — Executive Director, Partnership for Jewish Schools. For services to Education
 Ali Akbar Mohammed — Founder and Trustee, Ansar Finance. For services to Finance and charity
 Martin John Edward Moorman — Headteacher, Ravenscliffe High School and Sports College. For services to Young People with Special Educational Needs and Disabilities in Calderdale, West Yorkshire
 Christopher John Leon Moorsom — For charitable services in South West England and Wales
 Professor Dion Gregory Morton — Barling Professor of Surgery, University of Birmingham. For services to Innovation in the NHS
 Dr Sarah Nelson — Research Associate, Centre for Research on Families and Relationships, University of Edinburgh. For services to Victims of Childhood Sexual Abuse
 Dr Sanjiv Nichani — Founder and Chief Executive Officer, Healing Little Hearts. For services to Medicine and charity
 Mehri Niknam MBE — For services to Jewish-Muslim Inter Faith Relations
 Carol Lesley O'Brien — Lately Board Member, Road Haulage Association. For services to Diversity and Inclusion in the Transport Industry
 Dr Deborah Antoinette O'Neil — Chief Executive Officer, Novabiotics Ltd. For services to Biotechnology, Business and charity
 Muyiwa Olarewaju — Gospel Singer. For services to Music
 Julie Oldham MBE — Head of Library and Museum Services, Bolton Council. For services to Public Libraries
 Henry Stuart Owen-John — For services to Heritage Protection
 Professor Miles John Padgett FRSE FRS — Kelvin Chair of Natural Philosophy, Glasgow University. For services to Scientific Research and Outreach
 Alpesh Bipin Patel — Founder, Praefinium Partners. For services to the Economy and International Trade
 Alison Paul — Headteacher, Brimble Hill Special School, Swindon. For services to Education
 Professor Michael David Peake — Hon. Professor of Respiratory Medicine, University of Leicester and Lately Clinical Lead for Early Diagnosis, National Cancer Registration and Analysis Service. For services to Medicine
 William John Perrin — Trustee, Carnegie UK Trust, Good Things Foundation, Indigo Trust and 360 Giving. For services to Technology and Internet Safety Policy
 David William Petherick — Lately Chair, Committee B/559, British Standards Institute. For services to People with Disabilities
 Tobias Grant Peyton-Jones — Education and Skills Ambassador, Siemens UK. For services to Education, Skills and Young People
 Jeffrey Pinnick — For services to Holocaust Commemoration and Education
 Professor Simon James Trent Pollard FREng — Pro Vice-Chancellor, Cranfield University. For services to Environmental Risk Management
 Timothy Andrew Porter — Director of Programmes, The HALO Trust. For services to International Development
 Andrew James Price — Security Manager, Heathrow Airport. For services to Aviation Security
 Sara Victoria Protheroe — Chief Customer Officer, Pension Protection Fund. For services to Pensioners
 Sarabjit Singh Purewal — Principal Specialist Inspector, Health and Safety Executive. For services to Health and Safety and to Cyber Security
 Professor Sheena Elizabeth Radford — Astbury Professor of Biophysics, University of Leeds. For services to Molecular Biology Research
 Luthfur Rahman — Executive Member for Culture and Leisure, Manchester City Council. For services to Local Government
 Graham Douglas Ralph — Lately District Operations Manager, Work and Health Directorate, Department for Work and Pensions. For public service
 Charlotte Helen Ramsden — Strategic Director for People, Salford City Council. For services to Children in Greater Manchester
 Imran Rasul — Professor of Economics, University College London. For services to Social Sciences
 Nicola Rees-Lamb (Norman) — Acting Chief Executive, Women's Aid Federation of England. For services to the Prevention of Violence Against Women and Girls
 Professor Stefan Clive Reif — Founder and lately Director, Taylor-Schechter Genizah Research Unit, University of Cambridge. For services to Scholarship
 Ahmereen Reza — Founder and Trustee, Developments in Literacy Trust, and Director, Conservative Friends of Pakistan. For public and political service, and Interfaith Work
 Gary Richardson QPM — Detective Superintendent, British Transport Police. For services to Policing
 Alison Ruth Ring — Lately, Commissioners' Advisory Accountant, HM Revenue and Customs. For services to Accountancy
 Philippa Charlotte Grace Saunders — Assistant Private Secretary to the Prime Minister, 10 Downing Street. For services to British Trade Policy
 Professor Gillian Louise Schofield — Professor, Child and Family Social Work, University of East Anglia. For services to Children and Families
 Professor Paul Seawright — Executive Dean, Faculty of Arts, Humanities and Social Sciences, Ulster University. For services to Higher Education and the Arts
 Professor Nilay Shah FREng — Professor of Chemical Engineering, Imperial College London. For services to the Decarbonisation of the UK Economy
 Anant Meghji Pethraj Shah — For services to Education, Health and Animal Welfare
 Dr Nicola Sharp-Jeffs — Founder, Surviving Economic Abuse. For services to Victims of Domestic and Economic Abuse
 Professor Sally Ann Shearer — Executive Director of Nursing, Sheffield Children's NHS Foundation Trust. For services to Nursing
 Farouq Rashid Sheikh — Founder, CareTech. For services to Specialist Social Care
 Dr Graham John Shortland — Consultant Paediatrician, Cardiff and Vale University Health Board. For services to Paediatrics, Patient Safety and the NHS in Wales
 Fayann Louise Veronica Simpson — Group Board Member and Chair, Resident Services Group, London and Quadrant Housing Association. For services to Tenants in Social Housing
 Margaret Joyce Simpson — Director General, Rail Freight Group. For services to the Rail Freight Sector
 Helen Mary Simpson — Trustee, St Martin-in-the-Fields Charity. For services to charity
 Dr André Felix Vitus Singer — Chief Executive Officer and Creative Director, Spring Films. For services to Anthropology and the Documentary Film Industry
 Dr Philip Bryan Robert Smith — Executive Principal, Outwood Academy Portland. For services to Education
 Tanja Harriet Smith — Technical Director, Gradon Architecture. For services to Apprenticeships and Technical Education
 John Frank Smith — For services to Music
 David William Smith — Deputy Director, Border Force, Home Office. For services to EU Exit Preparation and Border Security
 Dr Vaughan Robert Southgate DL — For services to the community in Bedfordshire
 Ruth Anne Stevenson — Faculty Head of Performing Arts, Castlemilk High School. For services to Education in Glasgow
 Peter James Stevenson — Chief Policy Adviser, Compassion in World Farming. For services to Farm Animal Welfare
 Mandie Stravino — For services to Education
 Andrew Christopher Stylianou — Chief Operating Officer, Sky UK and Ireland. For services to Diversity and the Economy
 Professor Catherine Sudlow FRSE — Professor of Neurology and Clinical Epidemiology, University of Edinburgh, Director of BHF Data Science Centre, Health Data Research UK, and lately Chief Scientist, UK Biobank. For services to Medical Research
 Janet Claire Thompson — Headteacher, Dorothy Goodman School, Hinckley. For services to Education
 Sian Elizabeth Thornhill — Director of Education, Harrow International Schools and Lately Executive Principal, Skinners' Kent Academy Trust. For services to Education
 Dr Mark Gerald Timoney — Lately Chief Pharmaceutical Officer, Department of Health. For services to Pharmacy
 Kate Trenaman — Team Leader, Ministry of Defence. For services to Defence
 Barbara Kay Tudor — Victim Liaison Manager, National Probation Service, HM Prison. For services to Victims of Crime
 Mohammed Nizam Uddin — Senior Head, Mosaic, The Prince's Trust. For services to Social Mobility and Community Integration
 Lesley Anne Upton — Payments Technical Lead, HM Revenue and Customs. For public service
 Elizabeth Terese Vega — Group Chief Executive Officer, Informed Solutions. For services to International Trade and Digital Transformation
 Keith Vinning — Business Developer, Pilot Aware. For services to Aviation Safety
 Professor Jackline Wahba — Professor of Economics, University of Southampton. For services to Economic Policy
 Sally Anne Wainwright — For services to Writing and Television
 Dawn Jacinta Walton — For services to Theatre
 Sally Elizabeth Waples — Sexual Harassment and Personal Safety Lead, Women's Network, Department for International Development. For services to Inclusion
 Maria Wardrobe — Lately Director of Communications and External Relations, National Energy Action. For services to Tackling Fuel Poverty
 Rebecca Jane Warren — For services to Art
 Richard James Alexander Wates — For charitable services to Children and Young People with Disabilities
 Professor Sheryl Dianne Watkins — Professor of Public Health Nursing, Cardiff University. For services to Nursing Education and Research
 Christopher Charles Watts — Lately Deputy Director, National Security, Department for Transport. For public service
 Dr Hannah Jill White — Deputy Director, Institute for Government. For services to the Constitution
 Jane White — Adviser, Secondary Legislation Scrutiny Committee, House of Lords. For services to Parliament
 Michael Ian Whittingham — Director of High Performance, SportScotland Institute of Sport. For services to Sport
 Dr Lynne Wigens — Lately Chief Nurse, East of England Region, NHS England and NHS Improvement. For services to Nursing
 Roger Vincent Wiglesworth DL — For voluntary and charitable services
 Kathryn Charlotte Louise Willard — Lately Director, Stobart Group. For services to Transport and the Economy
 Professor Charlotte Williams — Professor of Inorganic Chemistry, University of Oxford. For services to Chemistry
 Euryn Ogwen Williams — For services to Welsh Broadcasting
 Gwyneth Williams — For services to Radio and Broadcasting
 Professor Lorna Margaret Woods — For services to Internet Safety Policy
 Ian Charles Yarnold — Head, International Vehicle Standards, Department for Transport. For services to Transport and Engineering

 Honorary

Member of the Order of the British Empire (MBE) 
 Military

 Civil
 Lorraine Abernethy — For services to Paediatric Occupational Therapy and the Covid-19 response
 Jayne Adamson — Volunteer Suicide Lead, Believe Housing. For services to Housing and Suicide Prevention particularly during Covid-19
 Sufina Ahmad — Director, John Ellerman Foundation. For charitable service particularly during Covid-19
 Hans Ahmed — Sessional Muslim Imam, Her Majesty's Prison/Youth Offenders Institution Brinsford. For services to Her Majesty's Prison and Probation Service during Covid-19
 Denise Elizabeth Catherine Allan — Managing Director of Customer Service, Sky Uk. For services to the Telecommunications Industry during Covid-19
 Sheridan Ash — Founder, TechSheCan. For services to Young Girls and Women through Technology particularly during Covid-19
 Professor Tim Baker — Engineer, University College London. For services to Healthcare in the UK and Abroad during Covid-19
 Lucy Gemma Baker — Service Technology Director, BT. For services to the NHS during Covid-19
 Geoffrey Francis Maitland Ball — For services to the community in Ellesmere Port, Cheshire during Covid-19
 Sarah Elizabeth Beale — For services to Girls and Young Women during COVID-19
 Melanie Jane Beck — Chief Executive Officer, MyMiltonKeynes. For services to the community during Covid-19
 Harmohinder Singh Bhatia — For services to Race Relations in the West Midlands particularly during Covid-19
 Zahid Hussain Bhatti — Managing Chaplain, Her Majesty's Prison Wormwood Scrubs. For services to Her Majesty's Prison and Probation Service during Covid-19.
 Michael Andrew Biggar — For services to charity and the NHS during the Covid-19 response
 Sarah Bowern — Deputy Head, Costume Department, English National Opera. For services to the Opera and Charity
 Rachel Louise Bowes — Assistant Director for Care and Support, North Yorkshire County Council. For services to the community during the Covid-19 response
 Collieson Briggs — For services to Vulnerable people in the community of Fife during the Covid-19 response.
 Captain Caroline Lesley Brophy-Parkin — For services to the community in Hawick during the Covid-19 response
 Leone Catherine Burns — For services to Health and Social Care during Covid-19
 Matthew William Burrows — Artist and Founder, ArtistsSupportPledge. For services to the Arts during the Covid-19 response
 Tina Butler — Head of Commercial and Procurement, Kent Fire and Rescue Service. For services to the Covid-19 response
 Lurine Lilian Cato — For services to Charity and Music
 Debbie Caulfield BEM — For services to the community in Londonderry during the Covid-19 response
 Oliver Luke Chambers — For services to the community in Birmingham, West Midlands during Covid-19
 Dr Sarbjit Clare — Deputy Medical Director, Clinical Lead Acute Medicine, Sandwell and West Birmingham NHS Trust. For services to the NHS during Covid-19
 Trevor Stephen Cockings — For services to Food Provision in the UK during the Covid-19 response
 Amelia Collins-Patel — For voluntary services to Children and Young People in the community during Covid-19.
 Simon Edward Constable — Railway worker, Network Rail. For services to the Rail Industry during Covid-19
 Christopher Conway — Charity Ambassador, Network Rail. For services to the Homeless particularly during Covid-19
 Dr Michelle Cooper — Chief Executive Officer, County Durham Community Foundation. For services to the community during Covid-19
 Sandeep Singh Daheley — For services to the Sikh community during Covid-19
 Stuart Graham Dark — Cabinet Member, West Norfolk Council Covid-19 Emergency Response Team. For services to the community in Snettisham, Norfolk during Covid-19
 Jane Davenport — Headteacher, Reynalds Cross School. For services to Young People with Special Educational Needs and Disabilities particularly during Covid-19
 Samantha Jane Davies — For services to the community in Queens Edith's, Cambridgeshire particularly during Covid-19
 Gareth Davies — Instructor, Sea Cadets. For services to the community in Scarborough, North Yorkshire during Covid-19
 Dr Eleri Mair Jones Davies — Consult Medical Microbiologist and Director, Infection Prevention and Control, Public Health Wales. For services to Healthcare in Wales particularly during Covid-19
 Kathryn Elizabeth Davies — Branch employee, The Co-operative Bank. For services to the community in Greater Manchester during Covid-19
 Imran Rashid Davji — Human Resource Administrator, Asda Ltd. For services to the Covid-19 response
 Carrie Deacon — Head of Social Action Innovation and Director of Government and Community Innovation, Nesta. For services to Social Action during Covid-19
 Professor Christian Delles — Professor of Cardiovascular Prevention, University of Glasgow. For services to the NHS during Covid-19
 Brendan John Doyle — Prison Officer, Her Majesty's Prison Coldingley. For services to Her Majesty's Prison and Probation Service during Covid-19.
 Professor Paul Elkington — Professor of Respiratory Medicine, Southampton University. For services to Medicine particularly during Covid-19
 Michele Elliott — Divisional Director, Barking, Havering and Redbridge University Hospitals NHS Trust. For services to Nursing particularly during Covid-19
 Trevor Elliott — Residential Home Manager, Ladywell Children's Home. For services to Vulnerable Children particularly during Covid-19
 Derrick Errol Evans — For services to Health and Fitness
 Ijeoma Nwamaka Ezeilo — Telecommunications, Sky UK. For services to the Telecommunications Industry during Covid-19
 Stuart Fearn — Head of Customer Contact, Newcastle Building Society. For services to the community in Newcastle and the North East during Covid-19
 Paul Findlay — For charitable service particularly during Covid-19
 Johnny James Flynn — Host, Virtual Pub Quiz. For charitable service during Covid-19
 Gary Frith — Health and Safety Advisor, Her Majesty's Prison Hindley. For services to Prison Staff, their Families and Prisoners during Covid-19.
 Susan Gault — Head of Public Health Nursing, Northern Trust. For services to Healthcare particularly during Covid-19
 Nicole Geraghty — Maintenance Scheduler, Briggs Marine. For services to the community during Covid-19
 Laura Jane Gill (Higgins) — Head of Strategy and Portfolio, National Crime Agency. For services to the Covid-19 response
 Adam James Gordon — Mobile Network Engineer, Ericsson. For services to the Telecommunications Industry during Covid-19
 Philip Nesbit Graham — Signalling Volunteer, Network Rail. For services to the Rail Industry particularly during Covid-19
 Clare Griffin — For services to the community on the Isle of Wight particularly during Covid-19
 Philippa Groves — For services to the community in Cumbria particularly during Covid-19
 Ian James Hammond — Senior Manager, BT. For services to the NHS during the Covid-19 response
 Jatinder Singh Harchowal — Chief Pharmacist and Head of Quality Improvement, The Royal Marsden NHS Foundation Trust. For services to the Pharmaceutical Profession particularly during Covid-19
 Peter John Harding — Team Member, TalkTalk Business Team. For services to Critical National Infrastructure during the Covid-19 response
 Jacqueline Elizabeth Harris — Service Centre Manager, Belfast Region. For services to the Delivery of Social Security in Northern Ireland during Covid-19
 Barnabas Thomas Guy Haughton — For services to the community in Bristol particularly during Covid-19
 Jane Ann Havenhand — For services to the community in Dinnington, South Yorkshire particularly during Covid-19
 John Henry Hayday — Security and Business Continuity Director, BT. For services to the Telecommunications Industry during Covid-19
 Malcolm James Healey — Campaign Co-ordinator, PPE4NHS. For services to the NHS during Covid-19
 Michael Hind — For services to the community of Teesside during Covid-19
 Rev. Canon David Paul Hoey — For services to the community in Eglington, Londonderry during Covid-19
 Manvir Hothi — Social Worker, Hammersmith and Fulham Council. For services to Social Care particularly during Covid-19
 Jean Marie Hughes — Retail Worker, The Co-operative Group. For services to the Food Supply Chain during Covid-19
 David James Adams Hughes JP — For services to the NHS and the Bereaved during Covid-19
 Marie-Ann Jackson — Head, Stronger Communities Programme, North Yorkshire County Council. For services to the community during Covid-19
 Kay Johnson — For services to Food Nutrition and the community in Lancashire particularly during Covid-19
 Paul Anthony Jones — Chief Officer, Denby Dale Centre. For services to Older People and the community in Kirklees, West Yorkshire during Covid-19
 Rebecca Emma Dorothy Kennelly — Director of Volunteering, Royal Voluntary Service. For services to the Covid-19 response
 Oli Khan — For services to the Hospitality Industry and charity in the UK and Abroad particularly during Covid-19
 Dr Matthew Jamie Knight — Respiratory Consultant, West Hertfordshire Hospitals NHS Trust. For services to the NHS particularly during Covid-19
 Sanjeev Kumar — For services to the BAME community during Covid-19.
 Dr Jonathan Tat Chee Kwan — Divisional Medical Director, Dartford and Gravesham NHS Trust. For services to the NHS particularly during Covid-19
 Anthony Leslie Larsen — For services to Operational Law Enforcement during Covid-19
 Graeme Allan Lawrie — Partnerships Director, ACS International Schools. For services to Education particularly during Covid-19
 Dr Thomas Oldroyd Lawton — Consultant in Anaesthesia and Critical Care, Bradford Teaching Hospitals NHS Foundation Trust. For services to the NHS during Covid-19
 Caroline Mary Lee — Head, Clinical Education Centre for Nurses, Midwives and Allied Health Professions. For services to Healthcare during the Covid-19 response
 Andrew Richard Lord — Chief Executive Officer, Alabare. For services to the community in Wiltshire particularly during Covid-19
 Dr Dominque Nuala Lucas — Consultant Anaesthetist and Lead for Obstetric Anaesthesia, London North West University Healthcare NHS Trust. For services to Anaesthesia during Covid-19
 Christopher John Luff — For services to the community in Watford, Hertfordshire during Covid-19
 Dr Carey Jane Lunan — For services to Healthcare in Scotland during the Covid-19 response
 Gail Margaret Lusardi — For services to Health and Social Care in Wales particularly during Covid-19
 Jane Geraldine Lyons — Chair, The Friends of St Michael's Hospice, Basingstoke. For services to charitable fundraising during Covid-19
 Hector Donald Macaulay — For services to Construction and the NHS during Covid-19
 Duncan Mackay — For services to Construction and the NHS during Covid-19.
 Ian Lowry Cole Maclean — Managing Director, John Smedley Ltd. For services to the Textile Industry and the Covid-19 response
 William Macleod — Founder and Chief Operations Officer, Veterans in Action. For services to Veterans during Covid-19.
 David Maguire — For services to the community in Glasgow during the Covid-19 response
 Gareth James Mallion — Network Rail employee. For services to the NHS during Covid-19
 Peter William Martin — Field Based Co-ordinator, BT Openreach. For services to Telecommunications during Covid-19
 Patricia Vivien Mayle — Support Leader, Greater Manchester West. For services to Girlguiding and to the Covid-19 response.
 Kathleen Margaret Mcgrath — Home Manager, Andersons. For services to Older People in Moray during Covid-19
 Elizabeth Joan Mcgrogan — For services to the community in Northern Ireland during Covid-19
 Jack Mcguire — Lead Developer, Keep It Simple Limited. For services to Vulnerable People during Covid-19
 Dr Julie Ruth Mcilwaine — For services to Healthcare in Cairngorms during Covid-19.
 Theresa Elizabeth Mcivor — Volunteer, Volunteering Matters. For services to the community during Covid-19
 Scott Mcpartlin — Network Engineer, BT Openreach. For services to Telecommunications during Covid-19
 Elizabeth Mcwhirter — Police Officer, British Transport Police. For services to Policing and Public Safety particularly during Covid-19
 Sandra Eustene Meadows — Chief Executive, VOSCUR. For services to the community of Bristol during Covid-19
 Lavina Mehta — For services to Health and Fitness during Covid-19
 Andrew Peter Miller — Team Member, TalkTalk Business Team. For services to Critical National Infrastructure during the Covid-19 response.
 Carole Milner — Instigator and Volunteer Convenor, Heritage & Crafts Funders Network. For services to Heritage and Crafts during Covid-19.
 Sarah-Jane Mintey — Founder and Chief Executive Officer, Developing Experts. For services to Technology and Education during Covid-19.
 Dr Catherine Tracey Moore — Consultant Clinical Scientist, Public Health Wales. For services to Public Health during Covid-19
 Professor Hywel Morgan — Professor of Bioelectronics, University of Southampton. For services to Biomedical Engineering particularly during Covid-19
 Andrew David Morris — Group Leader, Manufacturing Metrology, National Physical Laboratory. For services to the Manufacture and Supply of Personal Protection Equipment during the Covid-19 response.
 Eamon Mullaney — Professional Manager, Pharmacy Services. For services to the Pharmaceutical Sector particularly during Covid-19
 Leon Mundell — For services to the community in Greater Manchester during the Covid-19 response
 Michele Elizabeth Patricia Nel — For services to the community and frontline workers in Wigan during Covid-19
 Grace Elaine Nisbet — Anti-Poverty Manager, West Lothian Council. For services to the community in West Lothian particularly during Covid-19
 David O'Neill — Deputy Assistant Commissioner, Operational Policy, London Fire Brigade. For services to the Covid-19 response.
 Adekunle Olulode — Director, Voice4Change England. For services to the BAME community during Covid-19
 Mohamed Omer — For services to the British Muslim community during Covid-19
 Deborah Jane Pargeter — Headteacher, Tithe Farm Primary. For services to Education particularly during Covid-19
 Sandra Connie Payne — Director of Nursing and Care Homes, Brunelcare Bristol. For services to Social Care particularly during Covid-19
 Neil James Pearce — Head of Estates, Aneurin Bevan University Health Board. For services to the Covid-19 response
 Dr Jonathan James Hadow Pearce — Associate Director, Medical Research Council. For services to Covid-19 research.
 Zane Powles — Assistant Head, Western Primary School. For services to Education particularly during Covid-19
 Leahman Filmore Pratt — Christian Chaplain, Her Majesty's Prison Exeter. For services to Her Majesty's Prison and Probation Service during Covid-19.
 Gavin Gilbert Price — For services to the community in Aberfeldy during Covid-19
 Reza Rahnama — Director, Core Voice Services, BT. For services to Telecommunications during the Covid-19 response
 Marcus Rashford — Footballer, England and Manchester United. For services to Vulnerable Children in the UK during Covid-19
 Cordell John Francis Ray — Chief Executive Officer, Caring for Communities and People. For services to Charity particularly during Covid-19
 James Barry Rees — For services to the community in Ceredigion during Covid-19
 Dr Robin Anthony Ridley-Howe — Lead Medical Microbiologist, Public Health Wales. For services to Public Health in Wales particularly during Covid-19
 Heather Ann Russell — For services to Healthcare in Northern Ireland during Covid-19
 Claire Lesley Salisbury — For services to the NHS in Wales during Covid-19
 Dr Gurjinder Singh Sandhu — Consultant, Infectious Diseases, London North West University NHS Trust. For services to the NHS during Covid-19
 Jonathan Seaton DL — Founder and Chief Executive Officer, Twinkl. For services to Technology and Education during Covid-19.
 Chandni Sejpal Shah — For services to the community in North West London during Covid-19
 Richard Paul Sharp — Functional Delivery Lead, Capgemini. For services to Vulnerable People during the Covid-19 response
 Sarah Margaret Shaw — Director, Firstsite Colchester. For services to the Arts
 Jillian Margaret Shaw — Head Teacher, New York Primary School, Tyne and Wear. For services to Education particularly during Covid-19
 Samantha Louise Siddall — For services to the community in Edlington, South Yorkshire during Covid-19
 Dr Carter Singh — General Practitioner. For services to Healthcare in Nottinghamshire particularly during Covid-19
 Rajinder Singh Harzall — For services to Health and Fitness during Covid-19
 Stephen Douglas Singleton — Chief Executive, Suffolk Community Foundation. For services to the community in Suffolk during Covid-19
 Gareth James Smith — Department Lead, Severndale Specialist Academy. For services to Children and Young People during Covid-19
 Karen Smith — Emergency Authority and Government Relationship Manager, BT. For services to the Telecommunications Industry during Covid-19.
 Elizabeth Jane Stileman — For services to Incident Response and charitable service during Covid-19
 Olivia Antonia Strong — Founder, RunForHeroes. For services to Fundraising during Covid-19
 Margaret Sutherland — Chief Officer, South Denbighshire Community Partnership. For services to the community of Corwen during Covid-19.
 Vinod Bhagwandas Tailor — For services to the community in Bedfordshire during Covid-19
 Ian John Tandy — Managing Director, Global Trade & Receivables Finance UK, HSBC UK. For services to the Financial Services sector during Covid-19
 Juliana Mary Taylor — Nurse Consultant in Urology service, Salford Royal NHS Foundation Trust. For services to the NHS during Covid-19
 Paul Taylor — Operations Response Manager, RE:ACT Disaster Response. For services to Humanitarian Support during Covid-19
 Ella Terblanche — Principal Dietitian for Critical Care, St George's NHS Foundation Trust, London. For services to Dietetics particularly during Covid-19
 Robert George Thomas — Chief Executive, Vennture. For services to the community in Herefordshire during Covid-19
 Clare Thomas — Home Manager, Ilford Park Polish Home. For services to residential Social Care for Veterans during Covid-19.
 Richard Thomson — Train Manager, Transport for London. For services to Transport during Covid-19
 Siobhan Toland — For services to Local Government and Environmental Health during Covid-19
 Gemma Towers — Mobile Product Specialist, BT. For services to telecommunications during Covid-19
 Ashraf Uddin — For services to the St John Ambulance during the Covid-19 response
 Professor Matthew Robertson Walters — Head, School of Medicine, Dentistry and Nursing, University of Glasgow. For services to the NHS during Covid-19
 Elizabeth Ann Waters — Consultant Nurse, Aneurin Bevan University Health Board. For services to the NHS in Wales
 Michael Watson — Driver, United Parcel Service. For services to the community in Cardiff during Covid-19
 Joe Wicks — For services to Fitness and charity in the UK and Abroad particularly during Covid-19
 David Mark Williams — Railway Worker, Network Rail. For services to the Covid-19 response.
 Stephen Williams — Port Keyworker, Portico Shipping. For services to Shipping during Covid-19.
 Jill Williamina Young — For services to the NHS in Scotland during Covid-19.
 Kieron Robert Nnamdi Achara — Chair, Glasgow Rocks Community Foundation. For services to Community Sport in Scotland
 Sandra May Adair — For services to Volunteer Development, Management and Training in Northern Ireland
 Adebusuyi Adeyemi — Senior Policy Advisor, NHS England and NHS Improvement. For services to Healthcare Leadership
 Councillor Stephen Soterios Alambritis — Leader, Merton Borough Council . For services to Local Government in South London
 John Cameron Allen — Records Sensitivity Reviewer, Northern Ireland Office. For services to Safeguarding
 Bernice Suzanne Allport — Workplace Adjustment Team Leader, Civil Service Employee Policy, Cabinet Office. For services to Gender Equality
 Shanika Amarasekara — General Counsel, British Business Bank. For services to Business and the Economy
 June Angelides — For services to Women in Technology
 Robin Leslie Apps — For services to the community in the Borough of Tunbridge Wells, Kent
 Sophia Jane Archer JP — Chair, Norfolk Family Panel and Norfolk Magistrates Association. For services to the Administration of Justice
 Barry Armstrong — Senior Humanitarian Adviser, Department for International Development. For services to Victims of Humanitarian Disasters
 Darina Armstrong — Chief Executive, Progressive Building Society. For services to Economic Development in Northern Ireland
 William John Ainsley Arnold — Lately Member, Cheshire East Borough Council. For services to the community in Macclesfield, Cheshire
 Maria Arpa — For services to Mediation
 Albert Aspen — Trustee, Bolton Olympic Wrestling Club. For services to Wrestling
 Neeta Avnash Kaur Atkar JP — Non-Executive Director, British Business Bank. For services to Small Business Finance
 Ronald Anthony Leonard Atkins — For services to Horse Racing
 Andrew Oduro Ayim — For services to Diversity in the Technology Industry
 Anne-Marie Bagnall — Children Looked After Champion, Education Authority. For services to Education in Northern Ireland
 Rashida Baig — Head of Service, London Borough of Croydon. For services to Child and Family Social Work and Race Equality
 Martin Dawson Bailey — Author. For services to Art History and Journalism
 William Baldet — Midlands Co-ordinator, Prevent. For services to the community in Leicestershire
 Deborah Irene Barnett — Co-ordinator, Milk Bank Scotland. For services to Milk Bank Scotland and Infant Feeding
 Joel Baseley — Founder, The Roast Beef Club. For services to charity
 Ian David Beattie — Chairman, Scottish Athletics. For services to Athletics
 Richard Eric Belling — Chair, Belling Charitable Settlement. For services to the Education of Young People
 Julie Marie Bennett — Children's Rights and Participation Manager, Liverpool City Council. For services to Looked After Children in Liverpool
 Nelly Ben-Or Clynes — Speaker and Author, Northwood Holocaust Memorial Day Education. For services to Holocaust Education
 Christopher John Bentley — For services to Business and Culture
 Margaret Bibby — For services to the community in and around Chorley, Lancashire
 Rev. Canon Timothy Mark Frowde Biles — For services to the Church
 Denise Gaye Blake-Roberts — Director and Curator, Wedgwood Museum Trust. For services to Heritage
 Yadvinder Bolina — Lately Area Communications Manager, Crown Prosecution Service, West Midlands. For services to Law and Order
 Professor Laura Bowater — Professor of Microbiology Education, University of East Anglia. For services to Research and Education in Anti-Microbial Resistance
 David Brian Roden Bowden — For services to Cricket and the community in Sussex
 Laura Jane Brodie — Lately Headteacher, Allens Croft Nursery School, Birmingham. For services to Early Education and Children with Special Educational Needs
 Professor Steven John Broomhead — For services to Public Libraries
 Kenneth Frederick Charles Bruce — For services to charity and the community in Larne, County Antrim
 Georgina Florence Bryan — Election Agent, Preseli Pembrokeshire, Conservative Party. For political and public service
 Charles Ian Bryden — Chair, Wooden Spoon Scotland Region. For services to charity and Rugby
 Elaine Buckland — For services to Music and charity
 John Bullough Of Culcreuch — Chairman, Scotland's Charity Air Ambulance. For services to Emergency Healthcare in Scotland and to the community in Perth
 Matt Burghan — Team Leader, Ministry of Defence. For services to Defence
 Valerie Burrell-Walker — Fair Access Manager, Croydon Council. For services to Education
 Margaret Louise Cameron — For services to the Samaritans and Suicide Prevention
 Alistair George Cameron — For services to the community in Amersham, Buckinghamshire
 Thea Elizabeth Campbell — Disability Employment Adviser, Department for Work and Pensions. For services to Customers with Physical and Mental Health Conditions in Essex
 Natalie Denise Campbell — For services to Social Entrepreneurship and Business
 Marina Cantacuzino — Founder, The Forgiveness Project. For services to Victims of Trauma and Abuse
 Tracey Nichola Carter — Chief Nurse, West Hertfordshire Hospitals NHS Trust. For services to Nursing in the NHS
 Daryn Carter — Director and Programmer, Bristol Pride. For services to the LGBTQ+ community in Bristol
 Robert Cater — For services to Education and Science Engagement
 Emma Jane Elizabeth Chapman — Co-ordinator, In-Deep Community Task Force. For services to Preventing Isolation Among Older People and Children with Special Needs and their Families
 Yolanda Christina Charles — Bassist. For services to Music
 Geoffrey Thomas Cherry — Principal, Pond Park Primary School, Lisburn. For services to Education
 Shaun Edward Childs — Member, Barking and Dagenham Borough Council. For services to Vulnerable Families in East London
 Islamuddin Chowdhary — Barrister. For services to the Legal Profession in London
 Pamela Mary Chugg — For services to Women's Golf
 Stephen Barry Clare — Director, Holy Well Glass. For services to Stained Glass Conservation
 Dr Rory John Clarkson — Aerospace Engineer, Rolls-Royce. For services to International Trade and Aerospace Engineering
 Gail Hyacinth Claxton-Parmel — For services to Dance and Art in Birmingham
 Anthony Austin Cleary — Managing Director, Lanchester Wines. For services to International Trade and Exports
 Kathleen Shirley Clegg — Lately Chair, Official Prison Visitor Scheme, HM Prison Full Sutton. For services to Prisoners
 Madeleine Julie Margret Clements — Special Inspector, South Wales Police. For services to Policing
 Dr Jane Lesley Clements — For services to Inter Faith and Community Cohesion
 Geoffrey Andrew Clifton — For services to the community in Chester, Cheshire
 David Alexander Cameron Cochrane — For services to Tourism in Scotland
 Khadija Buke Coll — For services to Diversity and Equality in Scotland
 Philip John Collins — Lately Director, Corporate Finance and Performance, House of Commons. For parliamentary and voluntary service
 Janet Corcoran — For services to People with Autism
 Francis Edward Costello — Lately Chair, Wigan and Leigh College. For services to Education
 Glenys Irene Cour — For services to the Visual Arts in Wales
 Jeremy Mark Cousins — Head, Coal Liabilities Unit and Director's Office, Department for Business, Energy and Industrial Strategy. For services to the Coal Industry
 Cressida Cowell — For services to Children's Literature
 Kimberly Cram — Project Director, Macquarie Group. For services to Sustainable Energy Solutions
 Alison Cresswell — Lately Head of Participation and Education Services, Stockport Borough Council. For services to Education, Training and Apprenticeships
 Linda Crichton — For services to the Waste and Recycling Sector
 Major Randal Sinclair Cross — For services to the community in Ryde and the Isle of Wight
 Julia Margaret Cross — For services to Taekwon-Do
 James Andrew Stewart Curran — Principal, Harberton Special School, Belfast. For services to Education and Children with Special Educational Needs
 Joanne Jane Curry — For charitable service in North East England
 Arthur Richard Edward Curtis — Founder, TILE, Experience UK, ITEC and ETSA. For services to International Trade and Exports
 David William Curtis-Brignell — Deputy Chief Executive, Go to Places. For services to Tourism
 Stephen Daley — Captain, England Partially-Sighted Football Team. For services to Para Football
 Carl John Daniels — Deputy Senior Responsible Officer, Joint Emergency Services Interoperability Programme. For services to Incident Response
 Dr Bijna Kotak Dasani — Executive Director, Morgan Stanley. For voluntary services to Diversity and Inclusion in Finance
 Linda Marie Davies — For services to Education and the NHS in North London
 Clair Ann Davies — Principal, Appletree Treatment Centre. For services to Apprenticeships and Traumatised Children
 Councillor David Tudor Davies — Chair, South Wales Fire and Rescue Authority. For services to the Fire and Rescue Service in Wales
 The Venerable Rachel Hannah Eileen Davies — Founder, Tir Dewi. For services to Farming in West Wales
 Ellen Kerry Davis — For services to Holocaust Education
 Jill Elizabeth Dawson — Safety Officer, Chelsea Football Club. For services to Safety at Sporting Events
 Bernard Dawson — Member, Hyndburn District Council. For public service
 Susan Day — For services to Gender Equality in Sport
 Letitia Ann Dean DL — Founder, Bentimo PR. For services to Business and the community in Lancashire
 Paul Devlin — Occupational Therapy Service Lead, South Eastern Health and Social Care Trust. For services to the Occupational Therapy Profession and Healthcare
 Graham John Dickie — Artistic Director, Musical Theatre Course, Dance School of Scotland and Artistic Director, Young Scottish Musical Theatre Performer of the Year. For services to Musical Theatre and Education
 Elizabeth Dixon — Restorative Practice Manager, London Community Rehabilitation Company. For services to Justice
 Marcia Theresa Dixon — For services to Inter Faith Relations
 Ian Phillip Dolben — Fisheries Adviser, Environment Agency. For services to the Environment
 Erskine Decourtney Douglas — Accredited Counter Fraud Specialist and Head of Accounts Payable, Department of Health and Social Care. For services to Finance
 Michael David Drewery — Head, Debt Management Campaigns and Remissions, HM Revenue and Customs. For services to Debt Management Tax Collection in Peterborough
 Fiona Ann May Drouet — Founder, #emilytest. For services to Tackling Gender Based Violence
 Roger Dunton — Member, Harborough District Council. For services to the community in Market Harborough, Leicestershire
 Alison Edgar — Managing Director, Sales Coaching Solutions. For services to Entrepreneurship and Small Business
 Rioch Edwards-Brown — Founder, So You Wanna Be in TV? For services to the Television, Technology and Creative Sectors
 Selvarani Elahi — Deputy Government Chemist. For services to Food Measurement Science
 Graham Clive Elton — Senior Partner, Bain & Co. For services to the Economy
 Matthew Robert Hatton Evans — Leader, Conservative Group, Newport City Council. For political and public service
 Professor Christopher David Evans — Professor, Centre for Ecology and Hydrology, Bangor University, Wales. For services to Ecosystem Science
 Reanne Evans — For services to Women's Snooker
 Shirley Ann Faichen — Manager, Alverbridge Nursery, Gosport. For services to Education
 Ellen Marie Falkner — For services to Lawn Bowls
 Aurangzeb Farooq — Mentor, North West Regional Leadership Group, Mosaic. For services to Young People in Manchester
 Dr Derek Farrell — For services to Psychology
 Susan Anne Fawcus — Regional Resettlement Co-ordinator, South East Strategic Partnership for Migration. For services to Refugees
 Nigel Fenn — Senior HR Manager, Pennon Group Plc. For services to Apprenticeships and Technical Education in South West England
 Adrian Fisher — Founder and Maze Creator, Adrian Fisher Design. For services to International Trade and the Creative Industry
 Dr Ian Graham Fotheringham — Managing Director, Ingenza. For services to Industrial Biotechnology
 Professor Malcolm Leslie Garrett — Graphic Designer, Images&Co. For services to Design
 Brian Gault — For services to Thalidomide Survivors in Brazil and Children with Disabilities throughout the World
 Kadija George (Sesay) — Literary Activist, Editor and Publisher. For services to Publishing
 Joel Gibbard — Chief Executive Officer and Co-Founder, Open Bionics. For services to International Trade and Engineering Technology
 Karen Moriel Cecile Gibson — Choir Conductor. For services to Music
 Manjit Kaur Gill — Founder, Binti. For services to the Provision of Menstrual Products to Women in Developing Countries, the UK and the US
 Fiona Gwynedd Giraud — Director, Midwifery and Women's Services, Betsi Cadwaladr University Health Board. For services to Midwifery and Women's Services in Wales
 Suzanne Gooch — HR Director, Home Office. For public service and for services to Cancer Sufferers
 Pushkala Gopal — Dance Teacher. For services to South Asian Dance
 James Gordon — For services to the community in Alford, Aberdeenshire
 Angela Mary Gorman — Founder, Life for African Mothers. For charitable services to Expectant Mothers in Africa
 Darren Gough — For services to Cricket and charity
 Caroline Vanessa Grant — For services to Music, Media and charity
 Councillor Andrew Gravells — Member, Gloucestershire County Council and Gloucester City Council. For political and public service
 Debra Jane Gray — Principal, Grimsby Institute of Further and Higher Education. For services to Education
 Emily Jocelyn Gray — Lately Deputy Head, Girls' Education Team, Department For International Development. For services to Tackling Sexual Harassment Issues
 Wilton Owen Grey — Officer, Metropolitan Police Service. For services to Policing
 Jayne Edith Griffiths — Community Champion, Tesco Stores Ltd. For services to Business and the community in Llandrindod Wells, Powys
 Andrew Gordon Gunn — Lately Principal Economic Geologist, British Geological Survey. For services to Environmental Research
 Dilip Kumar Gurung — For services to the Nepalese community in the UK and Abroad
 Hilda Margaret Gwilliams — Chief Nurse, Alder Hey Children's NHS Foundation Trust. For services to Nursing in the NHS
 Lurel Roy Hackett — For services to the community in Bristol
 Karen Eastham Hadfield — Governance and Assurance Manager, Change Portfolio Management Office, Department for Work and Pensions. For public services and to the community in Wishaw, Lanarkshire
 Michael David Andrew Hall — Owner, Kestrel Foods. For services to Economic Development in Northern Ireland
 Richard Brian Hamer — Human Resources Director, Education and Skills, BAE Systems. For services to Social Mobility and Young People in the Defence Industry
 Dr Edward Joseph Hammond — Consultant Anaesthetist, Royal Devon and Exeter NHS Foundation Trust. For services to Medical Education
 Diana Lesley Hampson — For services to Higher Education and the community in Greater Manchester
 Jacqueline Monica Harland — Speech and Language Therapist, ARC Pathway. For services to Children with Special Educational Needs
 Paul David Harries — For services to Engineering and Employment in West Wales
 Linda Harvey — Headteacher, Beaumont Primary School. For services to Education
 Sarah Louise Haslam — Chief Engineer, Ford Motor Company Ltd. For services to Engineering and the Promotion of STEM Careers for Women
 Marianna Hay — Founder and Artistic Director, Orchestras For All. For services to Music Education
 Maxie Alphonso Hayles — Human Rights Campaigner. For services to the community in Birmingham
 Mervyn John Hempton — For services to the Economy in Northern Ireland
 Thomas William Higginson — Lately Chairman and President, British Association for Cricketers with Disabilities. For services to Disability Cricket
 Rita Hindocha-Morjaria — Executive Principal and Director of Secondary Education, Mead Educational Trust. For services to Education
 Alexander Simpson Hogg — Chair, Scottish Gamekeepers Association. For services to Gamekeeping in Scotland
 Kobna Holdbrook-Smith — Actor. For services to Drama
 Dr Paula Jane Holt — Pro Vice-Chancellor Dean, University of Derby. For services to Education
 Philip Edward Horwood — Security Projects Manager, Scottish Parliament. For parliamentary service
 Dr Rebecca Hoskins — Nurse Consultant, University Hospitals Bristol NHS Foundation Trust. For services to Emergency Nursing Care
 Martin Brian Howlett — For services to Cyber Security Skills and Young People
 Ching-He Huang — For services to the Culinary Arts
 Samantha Hunt — Volunteer, Survivors Fund, Holocaust Educational Trust, Remembering Srebrenica. For services to Holocaust and Genocide Education
 Julia Ann Hunt — Lately Director of Nursing, James Paget University Hospitals NHS Foundation Trust. For services to Nursing
 Isobel Hunter — Chief Executive, Libraries Connected. For services to Public Libraries
 Jason Iley — For services to the Music and charity
 Ann Ingram — Administrator, Ladybird Developmental Playgroup. For services to Children with Disabilities in Moray
 Councillor Mohammed Iqbal — Member, Pendle Borough Council and Lancashire County Council. For services to Local Government in East Lancashire
 George Irvine — For services to Education and the community in Carrickfergus
 Sarah Lucy Jackson — Headteacher and Founder, Parayhouse School, Hammersmith. For services to Children and Young People with Special Educational Needs
 Haydn Lloyd Richard Jakes — Team Member, WorldSkills UK. For services to the WorldSkills Competition
 Lucy Amanda Jewson — Founder, Frugi. For services to Ethical Clothing Design
 Lisa Marie Johnson — For services to Survivors of Domestic Abuse
 Eluned Griffith Jones — Lately Director, Student Employability, University of Birmingham. For services to Career Development in Higher Education
 Susan Jill Jones — Head of Nursery, Fort Hill Integrated Primary, Lisburn. For services to Pre-School and Primary Integrated Education
 Colin Raymond Jones — National Coach, Welsh Amateur Boxing Association. For services to Boxing in Wales
 Jessica Leigh Jones — For services to Women in Engineering in Wales
 Huw Glyn Jones — For services to the Economy in Wales
 Dr Hilary Robert Jones — For services to Broadcasting, Public Health Information and Charity
 Mordechai (Chuni) Kahan — For services to Holocaust Education and the community in Barnet
 Allison Kemp — Managing Director, A.I.M Commercial Services Ltd. For services to Transport and Logistics
 Arinze Mokwe Kene — For services to Drama and Screenwriting
 Julie Dawn Kent — Founder, The Emily Kent Charitable Trust. For services to charity
 Farrah Khan — Head, Service Delivery, Children's Services, Leeds City Council. For services to Children and Families
 Nasir Ahmed Khan — Co-Founder, Muslims in Rail. For services to Muslim Representation in the Rail Industry
 Rosemary Jane Kimber — For services to the community in Potton, Bedfordshire
 Lady Zahava Kohn — For services to Holocaust Education
 Parminder Kaur Kondral — Co-ordinator, UK Sikh Healthcare Chaplaincy. For services to the Sikh community
 Martin Paul Arthur Langsdale — Chair, Derby Cathedral Quarter Business Improvement District. For services to the Economy in Derby
 Professor Margaret Jayne Lawrence — Head, Division of Pharmacy and Optometry, University of Manchester. For services to Pharmaceutical Research
 Yvonne Aba Paintowa Lawson — Chief Executive Officer, Godwin Lawson Foundation. For services to Tackling Knife and Gang Crime in London
 Lisa Anne Lawson — Founder and Chief Executive, Dear Green Coffee. For services to Business and the community in Glasgow
 Stephen David Layton — Conductor. For services to Classical Music
 Jeffrey Harvey Leader — Director, Pikuach. For services to Education
 Jane Elizabeth Leech — Member, Independent Monitoring Boards. For services to Monitoring the Immigration Detention Estate
 Simon John Leftley — Senior Responsible Officer, Essex Transforming Care Partnership. For services to People with Learning Disabilities in Southend and Essex
 Janice Lever — Creator and Director, Jigsaw PSHE. For services to Education
 Professor David Michael Lewis — Chair, Riverston School, Royal Borough of Greenwich. For services to Education
 Thomas Nelson William Lindsay — Senior Coach, Ards Swimming Club. For services to Swimming in Northern Ireland
 Peter Moffit Crawford Little — For services to the community in Enniskillen, County Fermanagh
 Mark Jeremy Carlo Little — Chairman, Police Learning Advisory Council. For services to Policing in Northern Ireland
 Sophie Elizabeth Livingstone — Chair, Little Village. For services to charity
 Carole Lovstrom — For voluntary service to Social Mobility in Government
 Helen Patricia Luddington — Director, West Bridgford Out of School Clubs and The Playroom Nursery. For services to Children and Families in Nottingham
 Geraldine Lundy — For services to Aviation Accessibility
 Donna Lynas — Director, Wysing Arts Centre. For services to the Arts
 John Charles Lyons — Media Officer, Operation Cabrit. For public service
 Isobel Shand Macdonald — For services to charity and the community in Inverness
 Alastair Hulbert Machray — Editor, Liverpool Echo. For services to Local Media
 Donald Cameron Macleod — Chairman, Fundraising Committee, Nordoff Robbins Scotland. For services to Music and charity
 Jane Macquitty — For services to Wine Journalism
 Dr Ibrar Mohammed Majid — For services to Healthcare and Community Development in Manchester
 Susan Claire Marshall — Lately Chief Nurse, Sussex Community NHS Foundation Trust and Queen's Nurse. For services to Nursing
 Elizabeth Ann Marshall — For services to the community in the London Borough of Tower Hamlets
 Alan Marwood — Special Constable, Nottinghamshire Police. For services to Policing
 John Barry Mason — For services to Music
 Professor Nigel Joseph Mathers — Emeritus Professor of Primary Medical Care, University of Sheffield and lately General Practitioner, Bluebell Medical Centre. For services to General Practice
 Petter Matthews — Executive Director, Engineers Against Poverty. For services to Engineering and International Development
 Paul William Mayhew-Archer — For services to People with Parkinson's Disease and Cancer
 Fiona Mcavoy — Headteacher, Newton Primary School. For services to Education in South Ayrshire
 Dr Carmel Patricia Maria Mccalmont — Lately Director of Midwifery Birmingham and Solihull United Maternity and Newborn Partnership. For services to Midwifery
 Alan Roy Mccarthy — Chair, Western Sussex Hospitals NHS Foundation Trust and Brighton and Sussex University Hospitals NHS Trust. For services to the NHS
 Una Mccrann — Feeding Disorder Practitioner, Great Ormond Street Hospital for Children NHS Foundation Trust. For services to Nursing
 Donal Mccrisken — For services to Music, Education and Cross Community Relations in Northern Ireland
 Theresa Mcelhone — UNICEF Infant Feeding Adviser. For services to Healthcare and Families
 Laura Susan Mcgillivray — Chief Executive, Norwich City Council. For services to Local Government
 Shirley Mcgreal — For services to Tackling Youth Violence, Knife Crime and Poverty
 John Mchale — Member, Doncaster Metropolitan Borough Council. For public service
 Dr Andrew Keith Mcindoe — Consultant Anaesthetist, University Hospitals Bristol NHS Foundation Trust. For services to Medical Simulation, Electronic Learning and Assessment
 Colette Mckeaveney DL — Director, Age Concern Luton. For services to Older People in Luton
 Gillian Mckee — Deputy Managing Director (Northern Ireland), Business in the Community. For services to the community in Northern Ireland
 Errol Mckellar — Volunteer and Campaigner. For services to Prostate Cancer Awareness
 Mark Thomas Mckenna — Co- Founder and Director, Down to Earth Project and Down to Earth Construction. For services to Young People and the Environment
 Vincent Edward Mcnally — For services to the community in Hereford
 Sharon Elaine Medhurst — For services to the community in Edenbridge, Kent
 Simon Melluish — Chair of the Committee, Art for Youth London. For services to Young People and charity
 Susan Meredith — Team Leader, Ministry of Defence. For services to Defence
 Sajjad Miah — For services to the community in the London Borough of Tower Hamlets
 Dr Carolyn Margaret Middleton — Associate Director of Nursing, Aneurin Bevan University Health Board. For services to Nursing
 Isobel Mieras — For services to Music in Scotland and to the Revival of the Clarsach
 Colin Millar — Lately Principal, Killard House Special School, Donaghadee. For services to Education
 Lee Philip Miller — Deputy Chief Executive Officer, Thinking Schools Academy Trust. For services to Education
 Elizabeth Anne Mills DL — For services to the community in Rutland
 Dylan Kwabena Mills, Rapper. For services to Music
 Alison Anne Milne — For services to Rural Scotland and Agriculture
 Asgher Mohammed — Managing Director, Abbey Chemist, Paisley and Founder, Scottish Sadaqah Trust, Glasgow. For services to Pharmacy and charity
 John Trevor Monteith — For services to Adults with Learning Disabilities in Carrickfergus, County Antrim
 Jayne Beverley Moore — Lately Deputy Headteacher, Ridgeway School, Farnham. For services to Education and Young People with Special Educational Needs
 Debra Moore — Independent Consultant Nurse. For services to Learning Disability Nursing
 Chris Moore — Fashion Photographer. For services to Fashion and Business
 Erdem Moralioglu — Fashion Designer. For services to Fashion
 Mary Moreland — Chair, War Widows Association. For services to War Widows
 Fiona Edwina Morgan — Disability Employment Adviser, Department for Work and Pensions. For services to Mental Health
 Simon Benedict Morris — Lately Chief Executive, Jewish Care. For services to the Jewish Community in London and South East England
 Dr Cecily Peregrine Borgatti Morrison — Principal Researcher, Microsoft Research. For services to Inclusive Design
 Eve Muirhead — For services to Curling
 Morag Munro — Lately Co-ordinator, Crossroads Care. For services to the community on the Isle of Harris, Western Isles
 Georgina Ruth Nayler — Deputy Chair, Pitzhanger Manor and Gallery Trust. For services to Heritage and Culture
 James Bernard Neilly — For services to Sports Broadcasting and charity in Northern Ireland
 Jeremy Nelson — For services to Radio
 Doris Bell Neville-Davies — Trustee, Parentkind. For services to Education
 Professor Mark Timothy O'Shea — Professor of Herpetology, University of Wolverhampton. For services to Higher Education, Zoology, Reptile Conservation and Snakebite Research
 Judith Rosina Oliver JP — Member, Youth Referral Panel, Coventry Youth Offending Team. For services to Justice in Coventry
 Alison Mary Oliver — Chief Executive, Youth Sport Trust. For services to Sport
 Mark Paul Ormrod — Marketing and Communications Officer, Royal Marines Association and Charity. For services to the Royal Marines and Veterans
 Reverend Prebendary Jonathan Lloyd Osborne — Senior Chaplain, Metropolitan Police Service. For services to Police Officers and Staff
 Carol Jane Oundjian — For services to Bereaved People
 Dr Joseph Palmer — General Practitioner, South Eastern Health and Social Care Trust. For services to Prison Healthcare in Northern Ireland
 Kenneth (Keith) Lloyd Palmer — Founding Director, The Comedy School and The Comedy School Charitable Trust. For services to Entertainment and charity
 George Gottleib Parker — For services to the Business and community in Llanelli
 Vasant Patel — Senior Policy Officer, Department for Education. For services to Adopted Children and their Families
 Hemantkumar Kiritbhai Patel — Lately Trustee and Interim Chair, Royal Armouries. For services to Museums and Heritage
 Samantha Joanne Payne — Chief Operating Officer and Co-Founder, Open Bionics. For services to International Trade and Engineering Technology
 Brian Wyn Paynter — Project Director, Network Rail. For services to Railway Safety and to charity
 Eric Harries Peake — For services to Art and Ornithological Conservation
 Sonia Pearcey — Freedom to Speak Up Guardian, Gloucestershire Health and Care NHS Foundation Trust. For services to the NHS
 Sally Selorm Juliet Penni — Barrister at Law, Kenworthy Chambers. For services to Diversity in the Workplace, Social Mobility and Law
 Paul Andrew Philbert — For services to Music
 Carrie Anne Philbin — Director of Educator Support, Raspberry Pi Foundation. For services to Education
 Martin Edward Phillips — For services to the community in West Sussex
 Julie Phillips — Lately Head Coach, St Tydfils Gymnastics Club, Merthyr Tydfil. For services to Gymnastics in Wales
 Jennifer Elizabeth Pike — For services to Classical Music
 Jennifer Claire Pitt — Admin Clerk, SF Support Group. For public service
 Patricia Mary Plumbridge — For services to the community in Newlyn, Cornwall
 Dr Colin John Podmore — For services to the Church of England
 Helen Jean Pollard — Consultant, Institute of Physics. For services to Physics Education
 Irene Pollard — For services to People with Disabilities and their Families in Inverclyde
 James Oliver Portus — For services to the Fishing Industry
 Gloria Joycelin Pottinger — Foster Carer. For services to Children and Young People in the London Borough of Southwark
 Aline Teresa Poulter — Operations Manager, Surrey Heath Borough Council. For services to Vulnerable and Older People
 Stuart Powell — Team Leader, Ministry of Defence. For services to Defence
 Derek Pratt — Crawley Neighbourhood Watch. For services to Crime Prevention and Public Safety
 Councillor Susan Myfanwy Prochak — Member, Rother District Council. For services to the community in Robertsbridge Parish, East Sussex
 Graham Race — For services to Overcoming Disability Barriers in Aviation
 Tamara Rajah — For services to Technology and Entrepreneurship
 George Michael Rawlinson — Chair, National Water Safety Forum and lately Operations and Safety Director, Royal National Lifeboat Institution. For services to Maritime Safety
 Rosalind Read-Leah — Founder, Domestic Abuse Charter, Department for Transport. For services to Civil Servants experiencing Domestic Abuse
 Bethan Sian Reece — Mental Health Ally. For services to the Administration of Justice
 David Kenton Reed — Lately Chief Superintendent, Metropolitan Police Service. For services to Policing
 Madelaine Reid — For services to Girlguiding and the community in the London Borough of Sutton
 Edmund Reid — For services to Music
 Philip Christopher Richards — Lead People Partner, Tesco Stores Ltd. For services to the Economy and charity
 Margaret Elizabeth Robertson — Musical Director, Hjaltibonhoga, the Shetland Fiddlers of the Royal Edinburgh Military Tattoo. For services to Traditional Scottish Music
 Professor Helen Dawn Rodd — Professor and Consultant, Paediatric Dentistry, University of Sheffield, School of Clinical Dentistry. For services to Young People and NHS Leadership
 Therese Rogan — For services to Disadvantaged Young People in Northern Ireland
 Ann Rowlands — For services to the community in Derbyshire
 Josie Rudman — Chief Nurse, Royal Papworth Hospital NHS Foundation Trust. For services to Nursing, Patient Experience and Patient Safety
 Professor Emeritus Ian Gordon Russell — President, The North Atlantic Fiddle Convention and Director, Village Carols. For services to Music and Cultural Tradition
 Jon-Marcus Emil Ryder — For services to Diversity in the Media
 Dr Helen Louise Sanderson — Founder and Chief Executive, Wellbeing Teams. For services to Adult Social Care
 Baljeet Kaur Sandhu — Founder, Centre for Knowledge Equity. For services to Equality and Civil Society
 Diane Marie Sarkar — Chief Nursing Officer, Mid and South Essex NHS Foundation Trust. For services to Nursing in the NHS
 Leslie Saunders — EU Scrutiny Manager, Cabinet Office. For public service
 Jean Saunders — Senior Nurse, Asylum Seekers and Refugees, Swansea Bay University Health Board. For services to Nursing
 Janet Elizabeth Sawyer BEM — Founder, LittlePod. For services to International Trade, Sustainability and Exports
 James Scanlon — Chair, Leith Links Community Council. For services to the community in Leith, Edinburgh
 Alan Cedric Scott — Chair, Lincolnshire Scouts. For services to Scouting and the community in Stamford, Lincolnshire
 Kenneth Scott — Head of Inspectorate, Sports Grounds Safety Authority. For services to Safety at Sporting Events
 Pamela Scourfield — Chair of Governors, Bedwas High School, Caerphilly. For services to Education
 Elva Dean Sealy — For services to the community in the London Borough of Brent
 Jayantilal Shah — Founder, Positive Message Ltd. For services to promoting Anti-Racism in Southampton and Hampshire
 Qaisra Shahraz — Founder, Curator and Executive Director, Muslim Arts and Culture Festival. For services to Gender Equality and Cultural Learning
 Lynne Elizabeth Sheehy — Corporate Social Responsibility Manager, Legal and General. For services to the community in Cardiff
 Kate Elizabeth Sherman — Complex Trauma Physiotherapist, Defence Medical Rehabilitation Centre, Stanford Hall. For services to Military Casualties
 David Gray Sibbald — Founder, Sibbald Training Ltd. For services to Business and charity in West Lothian
 Mawlana Mohammed Tayyab Sidat — Founder, IMO Charity. For charitable services
 Julie Siddiqi — Founder, Sadaqa Day. For services to Promoting Inter Faith Understanding
 Sylvia Elizabeth Silver — For services to Older People through the National Activity Providers Association and to the Royal Air Force Air Cadets
 Katharine Francis Simpson — Vice Chair, Employer Engagement, North of England Reserve Forces and Cadets Association. For voluntary service to the Armed Forces
 John Stuart Simpson — Founder and President, On Course Foundation. For services to Armed Forces Veterans, providing Rehabilitation and Employment through Golf
 Gurpreet Singh — Non-Executive Director and lately Consultant Urologist, Southport and Ormskirk Hospital NHS Trust. For services to Healthcare, Equality and Fairness
 Angela Mary Singleton — Project Co-ordinator, Crewkerne Active Lifestyle Centre. For services to Community Health and Wellbeing
 William Slavin — Chair, The Whitehaven Foyer. For services to Homeless People, Education and the community in West Cumbria
 Valerie Elizabeth Smith — Head, Tariff Management and Duty Liability, HM Revenue and Customs. For services to Customs Policy and Operational Delivery
 Dr Craig Norman Smith — Technical Expert, Complex Weapons, MBDA UK Ltd. For services to Military Capability
 Charles William Smith — For services to Farming and Agriculture
 Margaret Anne Smith — For services to Lawn Bowlers with Disabilities
 William Smith — President, East Anglian Sailing Trust. For services to Sailors with Disabilities
 Sandra Cameron Smith — Foster Carer, Dundee City Council. For services to Children and to the community in Broughty Ferry, Dundee
 Carolyn Joy Smith — Road Safety and Business Performance Manager, Neath Port Talbot County Borough Council. For services to Road Safety
 Alan Gordon Snoddy — World Cup Finals Referee and Technical Instructor, FIFA and UEFA. For services to Association Football
 Margaret Ann Southall — Lately Headteacher, Corbett Primary School, Bobbington, Staffordshire. For services to Education
 Belinda Mary Southwell JP — Volunteer, HMP Erlestoke. For services to Offender Rehabilitation and the community in Wiltshire
 Karen Anna Spencer — For services to Further Education and Aviation
 Kiruba Sri Shanmuganathan — Executive Support, Department for Exiting the European Union. For public service
 Brian Stanislas — Product Manager, Civil Service Human Resources, Cabinet Office. For services to Flexible Working and Equality in the Workplace
 Polly Stenham — Playwright. For services to Theatre and Literature
 Helen Elizabeth Stephens — Chair, North West Area, Sea Cadets. For voluntary service to Young People
 Lili Stern-Pohlmann — For services to Holocaust Education, Awareness and Human Relations
 William Richardson Stewart — Senior Health Adviser, Department for International Development. For services to LGBT Rights and International Development
 Rae Diane Stollard — Member, Bournemouth, Christchurch and Poole Council. For services to the community in Bournemouth
 Rabbi Avrohom Sugarman — Director, Haskel School, Gateshead. For services to Education and Children with Special Educational Needs
 Karen Rochelle Sugarman — Executive Vice President, Shooting Star Children's Hospices. For services to Life-Limited Young People and their Families
 Sara Jane Sutcliffe — Chief Executive, Table Tennis England. For services to Table Tennis
 Johnathan Owen Aicard Thompson — For services to the community in Bognor Regis, West Sussex
 Reverend Dr John Isaac Thompson TD DL — For services to Her Majesty's Forces and the community in Cookstown, County Tyrone
 Jamie Thums — Chief Operating Officer, Lintott Control Systems. For services to Manufacturing in East Anglia
 Jacob Thundil — Founder, Cocofina. For services to International Trade and Exports
 Richard John Thurston — Researcher, Social Science. For public service
 Peter Townley — Trustee, Better Pathways. For services to People with Disabilities in the West Midlands
 Dr Karen Treisman — Clinical Psychologist and Director, Safe Hands Thinking Minds. For services to Children
 Sampson Alfred Kirkpatrick Trotter BEM — For services to Police Welfare
 Sheila Try — For services to the community in the West Midlands
 Bruce Kenneth Turner — Managing Director, PureMalt. For services to Business and the Economy in East Lothian
 Caroline Susan Jane Twemlow — For services to Riding for the Disabled Association in Northern Ireland
 Syed Afsar Uddin — Teacher of Bengali, Oaklands Secondary School. For services to Education and the community in the London Borough of Tower Hamlets
 Vivienne Upfold — Foster Carer, Barnardo's. For services to Children and Families in South East England
 Ruth Ann Van Dyke — For services to Childcare and Early Learning for Disadvantaged Children
 Ayse Funda Veli — Diary Manager, Leader of HM Opposition. For political service
 Michael William Hugh Vernon — Founder, Blue Horizon Record Label. For services to Music
 Professor Jane Elizabeth Viner — Lately Chief Nurse and Deputy Chief Executive, Torbay and South Devon NHS Foundation Trust. For services to Nursing
 Valerie May Walker — Lately Director of Nursing and Operations, Care for Veterans. For services to Healthcare for Veterans
 Michelle Antoinette Wallen — Singer. For services to Music, Entertainment and charity
 Patricia Mary Walsh — For services to the community in Skye and Lochalsh
 Julian Derek Webb — For public service
 Professor Janette Webb — Professor of Sociology of Organisations, University of Edinburgh. For services to Energy Transition in the UK
 Seonaid Clare Webb — Deputy Director, Secondary Legislation, Department for Environment, Food and Rural Affairs. For public service and for services to Cancer Sufferers
 Rebecca Showtica West — Team Member, WorldSkills UK. For services to the WorldSkills Competition
 Ian George Westgate — For services to People with Disabilities in Eastbourne, East Sussex
 Mark Culley Whelan — Lately Detective Sergeant, Lancashire Constabulary. For services to Policing in East Lancashire
 Truda White — Founder, Music in Secondary Schools Trust. For services to Education
 Densign White — Chair, Sporting Equals. For services to Diversity in Sport
 Colin Richard Wilkes — For services to Business in North East England
 Andrew Willard — Senior Officer HM Prison Channings Wood. For services to HM Prison and Probation Service
 Roy Williams — Jazz Trombonist. For services to Jazz
 Avis Alexandra Williams-Mckoy — Health Partner, Executive Board, Lambeth Safeguarding Children Board. For services to the Protection of Young People
 James Wilson — For services to Veterinary Practice and Animal Welfare on the Isle of Mull
 Catherine Elizabeth Winfield — Executive Chief Nurse, University Hospitals of Derby and Burton NHS Foundation Trust. For services to Nursing
 Daniel Kamin Winterfeldt QC (Hon) — For services to Capital Markets, Equality and Diversity in the Legal Profession
 Stephen Malcolm Spencer Winyard — Chair, Stobo Health Spa. For services to Business and the community in Peeblesshire
 Alfred Chi Bong Wong — Deputy Principal Accountant, Department of Finance, Northern Ireland Executive. For services to Racial Equality and to the Government in Northern Ireland
 Professor Simon Paul Wright — Principal Partner, Glencairn Dental Practice. For services to Patient Safety in Dentistry
 Denise Anne Yates — Charity Trustee and lately Chief Executive Officer, Potential Plus UK. For services to Children and Young People
 Martin William Yates — Training Manager, WorldSkills UK. For services to the WorldSkills Competition
 Dr Giles Yeo — Principal Research Associate, University of Cambridge. For services to Research and Communication and Engagement
 Elizabeth Anne Youens — For voluntary service to Swimming in Wendover, Buckinghamshire

 Honorary
 Angela Marie Tanzillo-Swarts — Forensic DNA Specialist, Health Services Authority, Cayman Islands. For services to the COVID 19 Response in the Cayman Islands

British Empire Medal (BEM) 

 Civil COVID-related
 Ibrar Akram — Service Delivery Manager, Transport for London. For service to Transport and the community in London during Covid-19
 Terence Allen — Porter, Interserve, University College London. For services to the NHS during Covid-19
 Reverend David Lee Anderson — Chaplain, East Lancashire NHS Hospital Trust. For Services to the NHS during Covid-19
 John Anderson QFSM — For services to the community in Fraserburgh during the Covid-19 response
 Hannah Mary Angland — Lead Nurse, Integrated Community Ageing Team, Islington. For services to Nursing during Covid-19
 Christopher William Armstrong — Driver, United Parcel Service. For services to the NHS and community during Covid-19
 Stephen George Edwin Baillie — For services to Education and the community in County Antrim during Covid-19
 Philip Raymond Baker — County Councillor, Saundersfoot. For Public Service during Covid-19.
 Julie Dawn Barry — For services to the community in Edenbridge, Kent during Covid-19
 Steven Barton — For services to the community in Tameside, Greater Manchester during Covid-19
 Dr Mahaboob Basha— External Relations and Engagement Manager, Energy Safety Research Institute, Swansea University. For services to the community in Sketty, Swansea during Covid-19
 Fiona Maria Belcham — For services to the community in Clitheroe during Covid-19
 Christopher Bell — Senior Member Services Officer, Capital Credit Union. For services to the Financial Sector during Covid-19
 Helen Bewley — Anatomical Pathology Technician and Mortuary Manager, Buckinghamshire Healthcare NHS Trust. For services to Pathology during Covid-19
 Paul Billam — Driver, Yorkshire Stagecoach. For services to Transport and the community during Covid-19
 Penelope Bond — Volunteer Reserve, London North East Railway. For services to the Covid-19 response
 Alex Osei Bonsu — Supermarket Assistant, Waitrose & Partners. For services to the community in Buckinghamshire during Covid-19
 Alice Bretland — Physiotherapist and Team Lead, Home Ventilation Team. For services to the NHS particularly during Covid-19
 William Phillips Cochran Brown — For services to the community in Largs during Covid-19
 Paul Christopher Alan Buckingham — For services to the NHS in Wales during Covid-19
 Kevin Burke — Project Manager, Govan Youth Information Project. For services to Children and Families during Covid-19
 Catherine Joy Burn — Director, Bassetlaw Community and Voluntary Service. For services to the community during Covid-19
 Georgina Margaret Calwell — Manager, Adult SLT Team, South Eastern Trust. For services to Speech and Language Therapy particularly during Covid-19
 Sonya Cary — Postmistress, Pontrilas Post Office. For services to the Post Office and the community during Covid-19
 Aileen Elizabeth Caughey — Prison Officer, Her Majesty's Prison, Magilligan. For services to Her Majesty's Prison and Probation Service during Covid-19.
 John Challenger — For services to Young People in the North West during Covid-19.
 Susan Chapman — Deputy Divisional Director of Estates and Facilities, East Lancashire Hospitals NHS Trust. For services to the NHS during the Covid-19 response
 Simon Charleton — Chief Executive Officer, St John's College. For services to Young People with Special Educational Needs during Covid-19.
 Michael Ignotius Chin-Chan — For services to Charity during Covid-19.
 Rita Chohan — For services to the NHS during Covid-19
 Bridget Joan Clark — For services to the community in Doncaster, South Yorkshire during Covid-19
 Karen Ann Clarke — E-Commerce Customer Trading Manager, Asda Ltd. For services to the Covid-19 response.
 Adam Clode — Caretake, Gladstone Primary School. For services to the community in Barry during Covid-19
 Anthony Lee Cocker — Plumber, Salford Royal NHS Foundation Trust. For services to the NHS during Covid-19
 Jade Michelle Cole — For services to the NHS and Critical Care Research during Covid-19
 Oliver Miles Coles — Founder, Hospitality for Heroes. For services to Hospitality and the NHS during Covid-19
 Julie Cook — Community Colleague, Asda Ltd. For services to the community during Covid-19
 Agnes Cook — For services to the community in Kinross during Covid-19
 Councillor Mark Lawrance Cooper — For services to the community in Newtonabbey during Covid-19
 Lloyd James Creaney — For services to Key Workers during Covid-19
 Ruth Helen Creaney — For services to Key Workers during Covid-19
 Lorna Creswell — For services to the community in Moray during Covid-19
 Deborah Crow — For services to the community in South Glamorgan during Covid-19
 Samantha Anna Marie Juanita D'Souza — Community Champion, Asda Ltd. For services to the community during Covid-19
 Arie Darbandi — Resident Experience Manager, Arbrook House, Bupa Care Services. For services to Social Care during Covid-19
 Neil Gordon Davies — Strategic Manager, Homeless service, Sefton Council. For services to the Homeless during Covid-19.
 Dr Hareen De Silva — For services to General Practice during Covid-19
 George William Adams Devine — For services to the community of Fen Ditton, Cambridgeshire during Covid-19
 Jayne Margaret Dingemans — Director of Patient Services, Garden House Hospice Care. For services to Palliative Care particularly during Covid-19
 Ahmud Raza Domah — General Manager, Hill House Care Home. For services to Social Care during Covid-19
 Aileen Donaldson — Local manager, TSB. For services to the Financial Services sector during Covid-19
 Gregory Steven Hayes Doughty — Transport Worker, Highways England. For services to Transport and to the Homeless during Covid-19.
 Hilary Margaret Dover — Service Director, Primary and Community Services, Swansea Bay Region. For services to the NHS during Covid-19
 Councillor Paul Samuel Dunlop — For services to the community in County Antrim during Covid-19
 Andrew James Dunsmore — Food Services Assistant, J Sainsbury's plc. For services to the community during Covid-19
 Damian Antony Edwards — For services to the community of Alkrington, Greater Manchester during Covid-19
 Karen Edwards — Local Authority Key Worker, Rushmoor Borough Council. For services to the community during Covid-19
 Ben England — Founder, Homechoir. For services to the community during Covid-19.
 Eno-Obong Esin — Ward Clerk, Adult Critical Care Services, Manchester University NHS Foundation Trust. For services to the NHS during Covid-19
 Haley Etheridge — Project Coordinator, Diverse FM. For services to Radio Broadcasting and Young People during Covid-19
 Ghulam Farid — For services to the community in Grangemouth during Covid-19
 Samantha Jane Gallagher — Nursing Home Manager and Registered Nurse, Brandon Park Nursing Home. For services to Social Care during Covid-19
 Paula Jane Gallent — Ward Sister, Cardiff and Vale University Health board. For services to the NHS during Covid-19
 Marlyn Gardner — For services to the community in Stirlingshire during Covid-19
 Dennis Brian Gargett — Operations Director, Marske Fabrication & Engineering Ltd. For services to the community during Covid-19
 Emma-Karin Gerdin-Miosga — Arts Facilitator, Wingham Court, BUPA. For services to Care Home residents during Covid-19
 Jack William Gibbins — Tactical Lead, St John Ambulance (Cymru). For services to the community during Covid-19.
 Bryson Phillip Gifford — Director of Continuous Improvement, Wellcross Grange Nursing Home. For services to Care Home residents during Covid-19
 Andrea Margaret Greenall — Health Care Assistant, Royal Bolton Hospital, Bolton NHS Foundation Trust. For services to the NHS during Covid-19
 Lynne Grieves — Nurse, Northlea Court Care Home. For services to Nursing during Covid-19
 Lisa Griffiths — Branch Manager, Barclays. For services to the Financial Services sector during Covid-19
 Margaret Patricia Gurney — Services Assistant, J Sainsbury's plc. For services to the community during Covid-19
 Sheena Hales — Programme Manager, NatWest Group. For services to the Financial Services sector and to the community during Covid-19
 Sophie Jane Hamilton — For services to the community in Peebles during Covid-19
 Ann Patricia Hannah — Rapid Response Laboratory and Cellular Pathology Operations Manager, Health Services Laboratory. For services to Healthcare during Covid-19
 Ann Harding — For services to the community in Settle, North Yorkshire during Covid-19
 Hazel Harper — Journey Developer, NatWest Group. For services to the Financial Services sector and the community during Covid-19
 Michael Steven Hart — For services to the community in Doncaster, South Yorkshire during Covid-19
 Andrew Wayne Hattersley — For services to the community in Harrogate, North Yorkshire during Covid-19
 Apple-Jane Isabella Hayward — For services to the community in Brentwood, Essex during Covid-19
 Molly Henriques-Dillon — Quality Nurse Team Leader, Black Country and West Birmingham Clinical Commissioning Groups. For services to Nursing during Covid-19
 Liam Robert Andrew Hewitt — Tenancy Support Worker, Pembrokeshire Care Society. For services to the community during Covid-19
 Mathew David Hill — For services to the St John Ambulance (Cymru) during the Covid-19 response
 Hugh Hill — For services to the Homeless in Scotland during Covid-19
 Robert William Hodgson — Senior Project Leader, Labman Automation Ltd. For services to the NHS during Covid-19
 Richard David Holmes — Volunteer Guide, The Mid Yorkshire Hospitals NHS Trust. For services to the NHS during Covid-19.
 Wayne Horlock — Station Officer, London Fire Brigade. For services to the Covid-19 response
 Jessica Lauren Horne — Clinical Lead, Respiratory Physiotherapy, Whittington Health NHS Trust. For services to the NHS during Covid-19
 Robert Johannes George Hunningher — For services to the community in Hoxton, Greater London during Covid-19
 Peta Jane Hustwayte — Teacher, Greater Horseshoe School. For services to Young People during Covid-19
 Emma Louise Jackson — For services to the community in Blackpool during Covid-19
 Henry Oscar James — For services to the NHS and the community during Covid-19
 Theivandiram Jeevathasan — For services to the community in Graffham, West Sussex during Covid-19
 Richard Jefferies — For services to the community in Mere, Wiltshire during Covid-19
 Christopher Vivian Jenkin — Chair, It Takes a City. For services to the Homeless in Cambridge during Covid-19.
 Clare Marie Johnstone — Head of Infection Prevention and Control, Central London Community Healthcare NHS Trust. For services to Nursing during Covid-19
 Marcus Charles Edwards Jones — Service Delivery Director, Docklands Light Railway. For services to Transport during Covid-19
 Rani Kaur — Food Services Assistant, J Sainsbury's plc. For services to the community in Bedfordshire during Covid-19
 Terence Denis Keen — For services to Health and Fitness during Covid-19
 Jennifer Keenan — For services to Women and Minority Ethnic Communities during Covid-19
 Gerald Keogh — For services to the community in Govan during Covid-19
 Hasnain Qamar Rashid Bhatti Khan — Medical Student Volunteer Co-ordinator. For services to Healthcare in South Yorkshire during Covid-19.
 Malcolm Kilpatrick — Electrician, Royal Oldham General Hospital. For services to the NHS during Covid-19
 Carole Kind — For services to the community in Staffordshire during Covid-19
 Minerva Pascual Collantes Klepacz — Matron of Ophthalmology and BAME Network Lead, Royal Bournemouth and Christchurch Hospitals NHS Foundation Trust. For services to Nursing during Covid-19
 Richard Andrew Knight — For services to the NHS during Covid-19
 Mustafa Kemal Koksal — Supervisor, First Buses. For services to the community during Covid-19
 Simon Richard Lea — General Store Manager, Asda Ltd. For services to the Covid-19 response
 Duncan Denis Leece — For services to the community in Banffshire during Covid-19
 Denny Levine — Social Care Assessor, North Yorkshire Council. For services to the community during the Covid-19 response
 Rhian Livingstone — For services to the community in Driffield, East Yorkshire during Covid-19
 John Loughton — Founder, The Scran Academy. For services to the community during Covid-19
 Eugenia Lyle — Customer Experience Colleague, J Sainsbury's plc. For services to Business and the community during Covid-19
 Paul David Mackean — Head of Laboratories, Babcock Rosyth. For services to the NHS during the Covid-19 response.
 Angus Maclean — For services to the community on the Isle of Harris during Covid-19
 Vajid Mahmood — PPM Strategy and Implementation Lead, NHS England and NHS Improvement. For services to the NHS during Covid-19
 Tracey Mairs — Registered Manager, Marple Lodge Care Home. For services to the Covid-19 response
 Manju Malhi — For services to the community in London during the Covid-19 response
 Lucy Mansell-Render — Nights Department Manager, Asda. For services to the Covid-19 response
 Belinda Alison Marks — Palliative Care Clinical Lead, Bradford District Care Foundation Trust. For services to the Covid-19 response
 Mairi McCallum — For services to the community in Moray during Covid-19
 Kathryn Fiona Mccloghrie — Head of Corporate Strategy, Sellafield Ltd. For services to Business and the community in Cumbria during the Covid-19 response
 Marie Therese McDermott — For services to Nursing in Northern Ireland during the Covid-19 response
 Gemma Patricia McDonald — Nurse and Volunteer, Newport Sea Cadets. For services to the NHS and to the community in Newport during Covid-19
 William McGhee — Oxygen Therapy Project Manager, National Services Scotland. For services to the Covid-19 response
 Sharon McKendrick — Store Manager, Morrisons. For services to the community during Covid-19
 Gary McKeown — For services to Education during the Covid-19 response
 Elizabeth Margaret McLean — Frontline Food Retail Worker, The Co-operative Group. For services to the Covid-19 response
 Helen McMahon — Home Manager, Four Seasons Healthcare. For services to Care Homes during Covid-19
 Lyndsay Jayne McNicholl — For services to Health and Social Care during Covid-19
 Karen Miles — Driver, Red Arrow. For services to Transport during Covid-19
 Jolene Miller — Train Driver, Northern Trains Ltd and Volunteer Paramedic. For services to the NHS during Covid-19
 Sharon Louise Miller — For services to the Care Sector during the Covid-19 response
 Herbert Brian Wesley Montgomery — Metro Systems & Performance Manager. For services to Public Transport in Northern Ireland during Covid-19
 Beverley Morris — CHC Lead Nurse, Black Country and West Birmingham Clinical Commissioning Groups. For services to Nursing during Covid-19
 Geoffrey Moyle — Catering Manager. For services to Catering in the NHS during Covid-19
 Lorraine Monica Mullen — For Services to the Community of Lochgelly during Covid-19
 Geoffrey Norris — Customer Delivery Driver, Asda. For services to the Covid-19 response
 Melesha Katrina O'Garro — For services to Music and Charity
 Margaret Payne — For services to the community in Lochinver during the Covid-19 response
 Tracey Ann Pearson — Senior Care Worker, Grove Lodge Care Home. For services to Care Home residents during Covid-19
 Louise Peart — Social Worker, Adult Services Intake and Assessment Team, Vale of Glamorgan Council. For services to Vulnerable People during Covid-19
 Stephen Philpott — Rough Sleeping Manager, Birmingham City Council. For services to supporting Rough Sleepers during Covid-19
 Reverend Matthew James Price — For services to the community in Gorleston, Norfolk during Covid-19
 Nilima Rahman — Bank employee, Virgin Money. For services to the Financial Services sector and the community of South Shields during Covid-19.
 Charlie Joseph Reader — Musician and Fundraiser. For charitable fundraising for the NHS and Charity during Covid-19.
 Julie Annice Redfern — For services to the community in Saffron Walden, Essex during Covid-19
 Timothy John Renshaw — For services to Vulnerable People and Tackling Homelessness during Covid-19
 Patricia Ring — For services to the community in Harpenden, Hertfordshire during Covid-19
 Emma Robb — Social Enterprise Manager, Resurgam Community Development Trust. For services to the community in Lisburn during Covid-19
 Mark Kenneth Roberts — Leader, Community Support Cell. For services to the community in Cumbria during Covid-19
 Karen Joan Rogers — For services to the community in Pumpherston, West Lothian during Covid-19.
 Catherine Ruddick — Activities Coordinator, Derwent Care Home. For services to the Care Sector during Covid-19.
 Sean Patrick Ruth QFSM — For services to the community in London during Covid-19
 Peter Ryan — Volunteer, Northampton General Hospital. For services to the NHS during Covid-19.
 Ajitha Sajeev — Street Population Manager, Newham Council. For services to the Vulnerable and Homeless in Newham during Covid-19.
 Toni Ann Salmon — Food Delivery Driver and Commanding Officer, Forest of Dean Sea Cadets. For services to the community in the Forest of Dean during Covid-19.
 Rebecca Saunders — For services to the community in Kelvedon, Essex during Covid-19
 Raymond Schofield — For services to Health and Fitness during Covid-19
 Shagufta Shamim — For services to the community in Grangemouth during Covid-19.
 David John Sharp — For services to the community in Menstrie, Clackmannanshire during Covid-19
 Melissa Mary Shearer — Personal Banker, Danske Bank. For services to the Financial Services sector and to the community in Northern Ireland during Covid-19.
 Julie Simonson — Community Branch Director, Santander UK. For services to the Financial Services sector and the community of Neath during Covid-19
 Margaret Jennifer Simpson — For services to the community in Rutland during Covid-19.
 Neeraj Kumari Singadia — Branch Manager, Lloyds Banking Group. For services to the Financial Sector and the community in Birmingham during Covid-19.
 Cleo Smith — Chief Officer, Age UK Hythe & Lyminge. For services to the community during Covid-19
 Nigel William Smith — For services to Care Home Residents during the Covid-19 response
 Adam Duncan Smith — Food Delivery Driver, Iceland Foods. For services to the community during Covid-19.
 Aaron James Sparks — Scheduler, First Buses. For services to Transport during Covid-19
 Elaine Spencer — For services to the community in Rossington, South Yorkshire during Covid-19
 Christopher Spicer — Project Leader, Zephyr Plus Ventilator Design and Build, Babcock International. For services to the Covid-19 response.
 Janet Adrienne Stewart — For services to the community in Lisburn during Covid-19
 Joanne Swaine — Area Branch Manager, Leeds Credit Union. For services to the Financial Sector and the community during Covid-19.
 Joanne Swan — Housing and Care Manager, Fountain Court, Gateshead. For services to the community during the Covid-19.
 Adam Tallis — Registered General Manager, The Kensington Care Home, Bupa. For services to Care Home residents during Covid-19.
 Kate Elizabeth Mary Tantam — Specialist Senior Sister in Intensive Care, University Hospitals Plymouth NHS Trust. For services to improving Patient Experience during Covid-19.
 Simon Taylor — Driver, First Bus. For services to the community during Covid-19.
 Kirsty Taylor — Co-ordinator, Bideford Community Centre, Greater Manchester. For services to Vulnerable Families in Wythenshawe during Covid-19.
 Winsome May Thomas — Matron for Quality and BAME Nurses and Midwives Network Chair, Imperial College Healthcare NHS Trust. For services to Nursing during Covid-19.
 Wayne Saville Tranmer — For services to the community in Castle Donnington, Leicestershire during Covid-19
 Sarah Troop — Director, Maldon & District Community Voluntary Service. For services to the community in the Maldon District, Essex during Covid-19.
 Joshua Trueman — Owner, JT Workshop. For services to Key Workers during Covid-19.
 Faisal Tuddy — Superintendent Pharmacist, Asda Ltd. For services to the Pharmaceutical Sector during Covid-19.
 Matthew Turner — Operational Control Manager, Santander UK. For services to the Financial Sector and the community in Bradford during Covid-19.
 Kirsten Urquhart — For services to Young People in Scotland during Covid-19
 Claire Uwins — For services to the community in Much Hadham, Hertfordshire during Covid-19
 Councillor Nicola Angela Verner — Joint Chief Executive Officer, Greater Shankill Partnership. For services to the community in Belfast during Covid-19.
 Maciel Pestana Vinagre — Assistant Manager Hotel Services, Ashford and St Peter's Hospitals NHS Foundation Trust. For services to the NHS during Covid-19.
 Marian Catherine Wandrag — Founder, Marian Newman Nails. For services to the Beauty Industry during Covid-19
 Alan Warke — For services to the community in Londonderry during Covid-19
 Pamela Webb JP — For services to the community in Swindon during Covid-19
 Nigel Wheeler — Prosperity, Development and Frontline Services Lead, Rhondda Cynon Taf Borough Council. For services to Waste Collection and Recycling during Covid-19
 Elizabeth Grace White — For services to the community in Longstanton, Cambridgeshire during Covid-19.
 Elizabeth Williams — Coordinator, Canolfan Pentre. For services to the community of Pentre during the Covid-19 response.
 Nigel Williams — For services to Local Government in Swansea during Covid-19
 Alison Williams — For services to the NHS and Charity during Covid-19.
 Sarah Wilson — Nursery teacher, Fishergate Primary School. For services to Education during Covid-19.
 Kyle Robert Samuel Wilson — For services to the community in Blairgowrie during Covid-19
 Emma Wimpress — Head of Volunteer Services, Northampton General Hospital. For services to the NHS during Covid-19
 Jacqueline Woollett — Home Manager, Oakshade Abbeyfield Chichester Society. For services to Care Home residents during Covid-19.
 Theodore Dimigen Wride — For services to the community in Sunderland during the Covid-19 response.
 Samuel David Young — For services to the community in Castlederg, County Tyrone during Covid-19
 Margaret Carole Zambonini — For services to those with Dementia and their Carers during Covid-19.

Civil (non-COVID related) 
 Edith Ann Adams — For services to the community in Fleet, Hampshire
 Michelle Alford — For services to Public Libraries
 Robert Allen — Lately Firefighter, Avon Fire and Rescue Service. For services to the Fire and Rescue Service in Bristol
 Kathleen Christina Anderson — For services to the community in Strathdon and Upper Donside, Aberdeenshire
 Myra Anne Andrews — For services to Performing Arts and Young People
 Christine Margaret Annis — Centre Manager, Downside Fisher Youth Club. For services to Young People in Bermondsey, London
 James Irwin Armstrong — Manager, Laburnum Boat Club. For voluntary service to Young People in Hackney, London
 Alexander Stewart Auld — For services to the Royal National Lifeboat Institution and the community in North Berwick
 Mohammed Aziz — Chief Inspector, Bedfordshire Police. For services to Policing and Diversity
 Dorothy Bailey — For services to the Scouting Movement and to the community in Staffordshire
 Herbert John Hastings Bailie — For services to People with Disabilities and Older People in Northern Ireland
 Margaret Ann Baker — Clinical Nurse, Specialist Secondary Breast Oncology, Swansea Bay University Health Board. For services to Patients with Secondary Breast Cancer in South Wales
 William Michael Roger Bankes-Jones — For services to Opera and Diversity
 Adrian Barker — Senior Policy Adviser, Home and Local Energy, Department for Business, Energy and Industrial Strategy. For services to Race Advocacy
 Audrey Barr — Project Manager, Women in Sport and Physical Activity. For services to the community in West Belfast
 Muriel Evelyn Barr — For services to the Northern Ireland Hospice
 Michael Wesley Barrett — For services to the community in Cheltenham, Gloucestershire
 Kenneth John Barsby — For services to the community in Elmesthorpe, Leicestershire
 Dorothy Baverstock — Member, Test Valley Borough Council. For services to the community in Romsey, Hampshire
 Marion Kathleen Beagley — For services to the community in Cheltenham, Gloucestershire
 Eileen Elizabeth Bellett — For services to the community in Osmotherley, North Yorkshire
 Tanya Faith Bennett — Commissioner, Goyt Division, Girlguides and Senior Coach, Spartac Gymnastics Club, Ormskirk. For voluntary service to Young People in North West England
 Andrew Bentley — For services to Libraries and the Arts
 Adrian Bingley — For services to the community in Sutton-in-Ashfield, Nottinghamshire
 Paul John Birch JP — For services to the UK Music Industry
 Raymond Michael Blowers — For services to the community in Spelthorne, Surrey
 Dr Sharyn Bord — Coach and Club President, Cambridge Diving Development Centre. For voluntary service to Diving in Cambridgeshire
 Kimberley Bottomley — For services to the community in Clerkenwell, London
 Hazel Jean Bound — Volunteer, Cornwall and Devon, Long Distance Walking Association. For voluntary service to Walking in South West England
 Christine Ann Bown — For services to the community in Keighley, West Yorkshire
 Rosemarie Brady — Co-Founder, Coventry Resource Centre for the Blind. For services to Visually Impaired People
 Paul Thomas Braham — Volunteer, Newry Lions Club. For services to charity
 Pamela Susan Brannigan — For services to the community in North Hertfordshire
 Fiona Maureen Brannon — For services to the community in Barnes, London
 Christopher Robert Britton — For voluntary service to Young People and the community in Guildford, Surrey
 David Brown — General Duties Co-ordinator, RAF High Wycombe. For services to the Royal Aviation Air Force and to Aviation Heritage
 Ian Michael Brown — For voluntary service to the Church Lads' and Church Girls' Brigade in Standish, Metropolitan Borough of Wigan
 Pauline Buller — For services to the community in Aghalee, County Antrim
 Brian Robert Burgess — Trustee, Brentford Football Club Community Sports Trust. For voluntary service to Football
 Harold John Burkhill BEM — For services to Macmillan Cancer Support
 Edna Mabel Cahill — For services to the community in Exeter, Devon
 Kevin Calpin — For services to the Traditional Craft of Architectural Stonemasonry
 Barbara Mary Cameron — Manager, Ireland International Ladies' Outdoor Bowls Team. For services to Lawn Bowls in Northern Ireland
 Paul Carey — Member, Glasgow City Council. For public service and for services to the community in Drumchapel, Glasgow
 Christine Carrothers — Senior Clerical Officer, McClay Library, Queen's University, Belfast. For services to Higher Education
 David Hugh Chambers — For services to the community in Churchill, Oxfordshire
 Paul Jonathan Chaplow — For services to Clay Pigeon Shooting
 Tina Jane Chapman — For services to the community in Templecombe, Somerset
 Cedric Raymond John Charlton — President, Richmond Squadron, RAF Air Cadets. For voluntary service to Young People
 Robert Cheesman — For voluntary service to the community in East Sussex
 Valerie Clark — For services to Blind People in Greater London
 Barry Clark — Head, Breaks Manor Youth Centre and lately Special Inspector, Hertfordshire Special Constabulary. For services to Young People and the community in Hatfield, Hertfordshire
 Gavin Denness Clark — For voluntary service to Scouting in Basingstoke, Hampshire
 Grenville Langham Clarke — For services to the Environment and the community in Suffolk
 Stephen Clarke — Lately Director, Tennis Wales and Member of the Council, Lawn Tennis Association. For services to Tennis in Wales
 Alan David Clarke — Founder, The Alchemy Charitable Trust. For services to charity in Sussex and West Kent
 David Anthony Clarke — Sergeant, Durham Constabulary. For services to Policing
 Vera Margaret Collings — For services to the community in Winchester, Hampshire
 David Alfred Collins — Vice-Chairman, Haywards Heath Branch, Royal British Legion. For services to the Ex-Service community in West Sussex
 Courtney-Lee Collins — For services to the community in Thurrock, Essex
 Stella Connell — Chief Executive, Birchwood Centre. For services to Homeless and Vulnerable People in Skelmersdale, Lancashire
 Susan Margaret Connelly — For services to the community in Romford, London Borough of Havering
 Catherine Louise Cooper — District Scout Commissioner. For services to Children and Young People in Rossendale, Lancashire
 Margaret Elizabeth Copland — For services to the community in Monifeith, Angus
 Philip James Courage — For services to the community in Bradford-on-Avon, Wiltshire
 Margaret Joan Magdalene Coutts — For services to the Falkirk and Central Scotland Samaritans and the community in Falkirk
 Marjorie Elizabeth Thelma Covey — For services to the community in Wellington, Somerset
 Geoffrey Cowan — Community Safety Officer, Cullercoats Lifeboat Station. For voluntary service to the Royal National Lifeboat Institution
 Peter John Cowley — For voluntary service to the Boys' Brigade in Tottenham and Ponders End, London
 Peter Crawford — For voluntary service to Gymnastics in the North of England
 Norman Crooks — Race Secretary, Cookstown and District Motorcycle Club. For voluntary service to Motorcycle Racing in Northern Ireland
 David Cummings — For services to the community in Chester
 John Joseph Curneen — For services to Sport and the community in Omagh, County Tyrone
 Keith Daniel — Volunteer, Army Cadet Force. For services to Young People
 Dr John Danks — Assistant Group Scout Leader, 1st Petteril Vale Scouts. For voluntary service to Young People and to the community in Eden, Cumbria
 Joanne Dare — Chief Executive, Age UK, Isle of Wight. For services to Older People
 Ian Darler — For services to Cambridge United Football Club and charity
 Tracey Davies — Volunteer Fundraiser, Velindre Cancer Centre's Charity. For charitable services to Cancer Patients
 Stephen Robert Davies — For services to People with Disabilities
 Ceri Denise Davies — Founder and Managing Director, More Mascots Please CIC. For services to People with Disabilities, Disadvantaged and Life Limited Children and their Families
 Lilian Day — For services to the community in Royton, Greater Manchester
 Amolak Singh Dhariwal — CFO Global Supply Management and Service Operations, Sodexo. For services to Business
 Jean Marie Dixon — Fundraiser and Ambassador, Yorkshire Air Ambulance. For services to charity and Patients in Yorkshire
 Valerie Judith Dixon Henry — Member, Waverley Borough Council. For services to the community in Ewhurst, Surrey
 Louise Doble — Chair, ACE Youth Trust. For voluntary service to Disadvantaged Young People in Ashbourne, Derbyshire
 Charles Donaghy — Lately Games Secretary, Durham Club and Institute Union. For services to Grassroots Sport in North East England
 Raymond Alexander Dowey — Lately Permanent Way Worker, Northern Ireland Railways. For services to Public Transport
 Helen Margaret Duncan — For services to the Children's Hearings System and the community in Glenrothes, Fife
 Jennifer Ann Dunn — For services to the community in Cannock, Staffordshire
 Rhona Dunn — For services to the community in Morpeth, Northumberland
 Valerie Dyke — For services to the community in New Ash Green, Kent
 Brian Edwards — For voluntary service to the Scouts in Thurrock, Essex
 Jean Ellershaw — For services to the community in Elworth, Sandbach, Cheshire
 Agnes Rae Elliott — For services to the community in Cowie, Stirlingshire
 Gwyneth Margaret Evans — For services to the community in Fishguard, Pembrokeshire
 Elizabeth Ann Evans — For voluntary and charitable services in Oxfordshire
 Anne Pauline Ewin — Mentor, Mulberry School for Girls. For services to Secondary Education in the London Borough of Tower Hamlets
 Jill Christine Eyre — For services to the community in Edenbridge, Kent
 Ryan Alan Robert Farquhar — For services to Motorcycle Racing
 Patrick Lee Wayne Farr — For services to Children's Hospices in South West England
 Robert Leslie Feltwell — For services to the community in Bentley, Suffolk
 Roger Stuart Fenton — Specialist Team Manager, Cheshire West and Chester Council. For services to People with Learning Disabilities in Cheshire
 Dr Elizabeth Olive Victoria Ferris — Founder and Chair, Dundee Dragons Wheelchair Sports Club. For services to Disability Sport in Scotland
 John Fisher — Founder, We Sing U Sing. For services to Education
 Theresa Ann Fisher — Community Champion, Tesco Stores Ltd. For services to the Economy and the community in Gloucester
 William Arthur Fleming — For services to Music through Ballyclare Victoria Flute Band
 Pauline Fletcher — Visitor Centre Co-ordinator, HM Prison Whatton. For services to Prisoners and their Families
 Charles Peter Flint — Co-Founder, Evergreens Table Tennis Club. For services to Sport for Older People in North East Scotland
 Robert Alan Forrester — Lately Lifeboat Operations Manager, Flint Lifeboat Station. For voluntary and charitable services to the Royal National Lifeboat Institution in North East Wales
 Kathleen Anne Forsyth — For services to the Northamptonshire Festival of Dance
 Antonia Forte — For services to Education, Housing and the community in Barry, Vale of Glamorgan
 Norman Mcleod Buchan Fraser — President, Ellon Branch, Royal British Legion Scotland. For services to the community in Ellon, Aberdeenshire
 Enid Elizabeth Freeman — Chair, Duston Old People's Welfare Association. For services to Older People
 Jacqueline Gavin — Trans Activist. For services to Gender Equality
 Peter William Gaw — Chief Executive Officer, Inspire: Culture, Learning and Libraries. For services to Libraries and Culture
 Colin William Gibbs — President, Tewit Youth Band. For voluntary service to Young People in Harrogate, North Yorkshire
 Leslie Gibson — Secretary and Head Coach, Aycliffe Amateur Boxing Club. For voluntary service to Young People in Newton Aycliffe, County Durham
 John Alfred Glenn — For services to the community in Londonderry
 Eve Glicksman — For services to Holocaust Education and Awareness
 Sheila Goater — For services to the community in Oakhanger, Hampshire
 Aileen Isabella Graham — Deputy Chair, City Growth and Regeneration Committee. For public service
 Susan Nat Graham — Founder and Chief Executive, Jaspal's Voice. For services to People with Motor Neurone Disease in the Asian community
 Desmond Davison Graham — For services to the community in Carrickfergus, County Antrim
 Florence Yvonne Grainger — For services to the community in Masham, North Yorkshire
 James William Graves — Chair, Merseyside Adventure Sailing Trust. For voluntary service to Young People in Merseyside
 Antony Victor Greenham — For services to the community in Beaminster, Dorset
 Patricia Lucy Griffiths — Co-Founder, Coventry Resource Centre for the Blind. For services to Visually Impaired People
 Joy Nancy Guy — For services to Education
 Alun Guy — For services to Music, Language and Culture in Wales
 Stanley Hacking — For services to Charitable Fundraising
 Nigel Stephen Hailey — County Commissioner, Scout Association. For voluntary service to Young People in Warwickshire
 Rosemary Caroline Haines — Leader, First Hawne Brownie Pack. For voluntary service to Children and Young People in Halesowen, West Midlands
 Margaret Maureen Hamer — For services to the community in Church Stretton, Shropshire
 Margaret Campbell Hamilton — For services to the community in Cookstown, County Tyrone
 Susan Hoyt Handley — For services to the community in Ewhurst, Surrey
 Samuel Edwin Harper — Lately Junior Convenor, Holywood Golf Club, County Down. For services to Junior Golf in Northern Ireland
 Clive John Harry — For services to the community in Knowle, Bristol
 Amelia Robertson Hay — For services to charity in West, Central and East Scotland
 Susan Esther Hayes — For services to the community in Winsford, Somerset
 Jill Hedgecock — For services to Girlguiding and the community in Clapham Park, London
 Margaret Jacinta Hegarty — Lately Vice Principal, Steelstown Primary School, Londonderry. For services to Education
 Mark John Henderson — Community Safety Team Leader, County Durham and Darlington Fire and Rescue Service. For services to People with Dementia
 Susan Elizabeth Hey — For services to Cancer Research and charity in Nairn
 Samuel Mathew James Hey — For services to Cancer Research and charity in Nairn
 Margaret Elizabeth Highton — Director, Evermoor Hub. For services to the community in West Lancashire
 Paula Jayne Hills — For services to Tax Credit Customers and the community in North East England
 Andrew William Hirst — For voluntary service to Leukaemia Research and to Lagan Search and Rescue, Belfast
 Peter John Hoare — For services to Cinema
 Lowry Noel Hodgett — For services to Business in County Down
 Alwyn Edward Hodgett — For services to Community Newspaper Publishing in County Down
 Janet Holden — For services to Public Libraries
 Pauline Holt — For services to the community in Thorncombe, Dorset
 Ruth Honegan — Constable, Bedfordshire Police. For services to Policing and Diversity
 Susan Jean Hopcroft — Guide Co-ordinator, West Lancashire. For voluntary service to Children and Young People
 William Robert Howard — For voluntary service to Hockey and Golf in Northern Ireland
 Susan Jane Howden — For voluntary service to Girlguiding in Sefton, Merseyside
 Hera Hussain — Founder and Chief Executive Officer, Chayn. For services to charity
 Norman Neil Mccoll Hutchison — Childline Volunteer. For services to Young People in Scotland
 Freda Elizabeth Ingall — Founder and lately Chair, Nottingham Cancer Patients and Carers Support Group. For services to people with Cancer and their Carers
 Sonia Katherine Mary Inkster — For services to the community in Scalloway, Shetland Isles
 Renate Fanny Inow — For services to Holocaust Education and Awareness
 Luci Claire Isaacson (Scholes) — For services to Flood Risk Management in Cornwall
 Lord Celal Izcibayar — President, UK Turkish Scouting. For voluntary service to Scouting in the Turkish-Cypriot community in the UK
 Peter Jackson — For services to the community in Tamworth, Staffordshire
 Parbir Kaur Jagpal — Lead for Equality, Diversity and Inclusion, University of Birmingham. For services to Diversity and Inclusion in Health
 Jayne James — Lately Journalist, British Broadcasting Corporation. For services to charity and the community in Wales
 Paul David Jameson — Fundraiser, Motor Neurone Disease Association. For charitable services to People with Motor Neurone Disease
 Cyril Jancey — For voluntary service to the Scouts in Brighton, East Sussex
 Henry Robert Jenner — For services to the community in Halifax, West Yorkshire
 Casyo Johnson — Musician. For services to Music and the community in Croydon
 Ursula Mary Johnston — For services to the community in Aldershot, Hampshire and Elstead, Surrey
 Albert Paul Jolly — For services to Lions International and the community in Solihull, West Midlands
 Jennifer Jones — For services to the community in Little Leigh, Cheshire
 Brian Keech — For services to the community in Cranford, Northamptonshire
 Thomas Meria Kenny — Estates Supervisor, Police Scotland College, Tulliallan. For services to Policing and the community in Tulliallan
 Hannah Patricia Kentish — Lately UK Youth Commissioner, Scout Association. For voluntary service to Scouting and Young People
 Elizabeth Anne Keys — For services to Road Safety in Northern Ireland
 Hana Kleiner — For services to Holocaust Education and Awareness
 Thomas Komoly — For services to Holocaust Education and Awareness
 Dr Marcel Ladenheim — For services to Holocaust Education and Awareness
 Professor Peter Laszlo Lantos — For services to Holocaust Education and Awareness
 John Leonard Lawson — For services to the community in Portaferry, County Down
 Ronald Leslie — For services to the community in Angus
 Elizabeth Frances Lewis — For services to the community in Church Stretton, Shropshire
 Lieutenant Colonel (Rtd) Michael Hugh Ledston Lewis — Chair and Fundraiser, SSAFA Powys. For charitable services
 David Thomas Lillicrap — For voluntary service to the Army Cadet Force in Devon
 Brian Irving Logan — For services to Drama and the Performing Arts in Northern Ireland
 Donna Loveland — Fundraiser, Scarborough Lifeboat Station. For charitable services to the Royal National Lifeboat Institution
 Jeffrey Lunn — For services to Nature Conservation in Yorkshire
 Sheila Lymer — For services to the community in Boston, Lincolnshire
 Dr Wendy June Madgwick — For charitable services in Deal, Kent
 Gordon Thomas Main — Coach, Nairn Road Runners. For services to Athletics in Nairn, Scotland
 Terence Hamilton Malcolm — For services to Road Safety in Northern Ireland
 Colin Hayden Malkin — Group Scout Leader, Scouts. For services to Young People in Melling, Merseyside
 Irene Maloney — For services to People with Disabilities and Guide Dogs UK
 Leslie Greer Marshall — For services to the Royal Ulster Constabulary George Cross Parents' Association
 Sandra Mason — For services to the community in South Hetton, County Durham
 David James Mason — Community Safety Patrol Officer, Basingstoke and Deane Borough Council. For services to Homeless People in Basingstoke, Hampshire
 Alan McBride — For services to Music in Northern Ireland
 Thomas Robert McCormick QPM — For services to the Boys' Brigade and to Young People in Northern Ireland
 John Rodney McCullough — For services to Maritime and Industrial Heritage in the Titanic Quarter, Belfast
 Anna McGee — Volunteer. For services to Homeless People in Coventry, West Midlands
 Alexander Michael McGowan — For services to Amateur Boxing and the community in Ellesmere Port, Cheshire
 Yasmin McGrath — For services to the community in Ellesmere Port and West Cheshire
 Martin McHale — Conductor, City of Cardiff Symphony Orchestra. For services to Music
 Helen Mary McHugh — Honorary Events and Welfare Adviser, Royal National Lifeboat Institution. For services to Retired Staff
 James McIlorum — For services to Young People in Newtownards, County Down
 Mairi Ann McIntyre — For services to the community in Wigtownshire
 Irene Edith McKee — Founder and Secretary, Friends of Armagh County Museum. For services to History and Heritage in County Armagh
 Conor McKevitt — Team Member, WorldSkills UK. For services to the WorldSkills Competition
 Phoebe Leigh McLavy — Team Member, WorldSkills UK. For services to the WorldSkills Competition
 John Wallace Alexander McLellan — Lately Veterans Helpline Operator, Veterans Enquiry Centre. For services to Defence and to the community in Lancashire
 Elizabeth Ann Meade — Team Leader, Passenger Services and Corporate Finance Advisory, Department for Transport. For public service
 Mayameen Meftahi — For services to Victims of Child Sexual Abuse in Wales
 Jake Julian Barrington Meyer — For services to Mountaineering, Young People and charity
 Sufu Miah — For services to the community in Oswestry, Shropshire
 Laura Jane Millward — Run Director, Penrose Parkrun, Helston. For voluntary and charitable services to the community in Cornwall
 Kurshida Mirza — Volunteer Organiser, Great Get Together Iftar and Truby's Garden Tea Room (Inter Faith Cafe). For services to Inter Faith and Community Cohesion in Milton Keynes, Buckinghamshire
 Andrew Henry Mitchell — For services to the community in Blackpool, Lancashire
 Ruby Mitchell — For services to the community in Carluke, Lanarkshire
 Shaun Michael Moody — Group Manager, South Wales Fire and Rescue Service. For services to Search and Rescue
 Gloria Alexandra Moore — For services to People with Parkinson's Disease in Northern Ireland
 David Moreton — General Manager, Oak Tree Farm Rural Project. For services to People with Learning Disabilities in Staffordshire
 Michael George Philip Naylor — Chair, Cardio Gym Club, University Hospitals Birmingham NHS Foundation Trust. For services to Cardiac Rehabilitation
 Mervyn Needham — Voluntary Manager, Worcestershire Wildlife Trust. For services to Conservation and the community in Chaddesley Corbett, Worcestershire
 Hazel Lillian Nelson — Practice Nurse, Cobridge Surgery and Queen's Nurse. For services to Nursing and the community in Staffordshire
 Samuel George Nicholl — For services to the Northern Ireland Ambulance Service and the community in Northern Ireland
 Eleanor Denise Nicol — For services to the community in Rye, East Sussex
 Julia Northen — For services to the community in Grimsby
 Christine Joan O'Reilly — For services to the community in Cambridge
 Teleola Atoke Martha Ilori Oganla — Founder, Teleola Martha Christian Organisation. For services to the community in South East London
 Folashade Oginni — Chair, Carer's Network, Department for Transport. For services to Carers in the Department for Transport
 Tinuola Oni — Project Management Support Officer, Department for Environment, Food and Rural Affairs. For public and charitable services
 Donna Orphan — For services to the community in St Germans, Cornwall
 Dr Richard Edward Painter — For services to the community in Swindon, Staffordshire
 Barrie Stuart Palmer — Founder and Trustee, Somerset Unit for Radiotherapy Equipment. For services to Cancer Treatment
 Alan Frank Pannell — For services to the community in the London Borough of Hillingdon
 David Malcolm Parlons — For services to the Jewish Community in London
 Joy Lorainne Pendleton — Nursery Assistant, Castlereagh Nursery School. For services to Early Years Education
 Patricia Percival — For services to the community in Stanhope, County Durham
 Valerie Anne Peterkin — Assistant Leader, Girlguide Group, Bermondsey. For voluntary service to Young People in Rotherhithe and Bermondsey, London
 Roy Frederick Pickles — For services to the community in Buxton, Derbyshire
 Emma Picton-Jones — Founder, the DPJ Foundation. For services to charity
 Richard Gerard Pollins — For services to the Motor Neurone Disease Association
 Celia Dorothy Powis — Popmobility Fitness Instructor. For services to the community in Worthing, West Sussex
 Jane Rosemary Pratt — For services to the community in Menston, West Yorkshire
 Parminder Singh Purewal — Director, The Normandy Hotel. For services to Hospitality in Renfrew
 Shirley Margaret Quemby — Lately Trustee, downsyndrome OK. For services to People with Disabilities
 Jonathan Rea — For services to Music in Northern Ireland
 Gail Margaret Elizabeth Redmond — For services to the community in Dromore, County Down
 Sandra Anne Rees — Manager, Community Impact Team, Scarborough Borough Council. For services to the community in Scarborough, North Yorkshire
 Teresa Carol Ricketts — For voluntary service to Girlguiding in Plymouth, Devon
 Peter Ridler — For services to the community in Yeovil, Somerset
 Robert Graham Ritchie — Chieftain, Newtonmore Camanachd Club. For services to Shinty and the community in Newtonmore, Inverness-shire
 David George Robins — Honorary Secretary, North Staffordshire Grenadier Guards Association. For services to Veterans in North Staffordshire
 Patricia Ruddle — For services to the community in Rutland
 Elizabeth Joyce Rutherford — For services to Children with Disabilities and their Families in Edinburgh
 Farzaneh Saadat — Manager, Cecil Court Residential Home. For services to Older People with Dementia
 Parveen Sajid — For services to Vulnerable People in Lebanon and to the community in Glasgow
 David Edward Sales — For services to Commercial Fishing and the Marine Environment in Lyme Bay, South West England
 David Michael Saunders — For services to charity in Beaconsfield, Buckinghamshire
 Julie Anne Scurfield — Founder and Chair, Chester-le-Street Amazons Girls' Football Club. For voluntary service to Girls' Football in Chester-le-Street, County Durham
 Robert Mcdonald Johnston Shanks — For services to the Seaforth Highlanders Regimental Association and the community in Culloden, Inverness and Dingwall
 Elizabeth Ann Shannon — Senior Clerical Assistant, Ochiltree Primary School. For services to Education and Sport in East Ayrshire
 Susan Josephine Sheppard — Lately Biodiversity Officer, Staffordshire County Council. For services to the Environment
 Matthew Martin Shields — For services to Running in Northern Ireland
 Elizabeth Margaret Sillery — For services to the community in Belfast
 Dr Satyavir Singhal — For services to the community in Belfast
 Christopher David Singletary — For services to Veterans, their Families and the Armed Forces
 Jill Rosemary Slatter — For voluntary service to Athletics and the community in Oxfordshire
 Linda Smallthwaite — For voluntary service to Girlguiding on the Wirral
 Andrew Leonard Smith — Catering Senior Officer, HMP Maghaberry. For services to HMP Maghaberry in Northern Ireland
 Sarah Smith — For services to Public Libraries
 Jean Carol Sowten — Manager, Sevenoaks Day Nursery. For services to Education
 Muriel Anne Stapleton — Captain, 2nd Plymouth Girls' Brigade. For voluntary service to Young People in Plymouth, Devon
 Elfriede Starer — For services to Holocaust Education and Awareness
 Kevin Charles Staveley — For services to Chess in Wales
 Lee Anne Steel — For services to Rugby and the community in Livingston
 Sarah Elizabeth Stewart — For services to the community in Markethill and Mountnorris, County Armagh
 Wilfrid Blake Stimpson — Member, Brackley Town Council. For services to the community in Brackley, Northamptonshire
 Pauline Stirling — For voluntary service to Disability Sport in Aberdeenshire
 Katharine Diana St John-Brooks — President, Link Age Southwark. For services to Older People and the community in Southwark, London
 John Stobbart — Coxwain, Royal National Lifeboat Institution, Workington, Cumbria. For voluntary service to Maritime Safety
 Julian Stone — For services to charity
 Gary Stringer — For services to Vulnerable People and the community in Derbyshire
 Rina Surjan — For services to the BAME community in Greater Manchester
 Julian Francis Tagg — Chair, Exeter City Community Trust. For services to Sport and the community in Exeter, Devon
 Nicholas John Tanner — Lately Lead Nurse for Homelessness, Medway Community Healthcare. For services to Homeless People in London and Medway
 Martin John Griffin Tapp — For services to Flood Risk Management in Kent
 Thomas Taylor — Assistant Director, Security and Operations, University of Worcester. For services to Student Wellbeing and Fundraising
 Susan Therese Taylor — Manager, Benefits Service, Cheshire West and Chester Council. For services to Local Government
 Malcolm Temple — Member, Eden District Council. For services to Local Government in Cumbria
 Bharat Thakrar — For voluntary and charitable services in the UK and Abroad
 Anne Thomas — Staff Nurse, Betsi Cadwaladr University Health Board. For services to Nursing
 Geraint Andrew Thomas — For services to the Samaritans, Mountain Rescue and Disadvantaged People in South West Wales
 Ian Cooper Thomson — Secretary, Lumphanan Branch, Royal British Legion Scotland. For voluntary service to the Ex-Service community in Aberdeenshire
 Margaret Elizabeth Tracey — Director, Mudchute Farm. For services to the community in the Isle of Dogs, London
 Joseph Luke Trusselle — Sergeant, West Midlands Police. For services to Neighbourhood Policing
 Bronwen Mary Tyler — For services to the community in Thompson, Norfolk
 Roger Henry Tym — For services to the community in Stockbridge, Hampshire
 Lesley Anne Elizabeth Utting — Instructor and Detachment Commander, Suffolk Army Cadet Force. For voluntary service to Young People
 Mark Wakefield — Vice-Chair, UK Youth. For services to Young People
 Nigel John Walker — Prison Officer, HM Prisons, Northern Ireland. For services to the Northern Ireland Prison Service
 Phillip Owen Wallace — Chairman, Stevenage Football Club. For services to Association Football and the community in Hertfordshire
 David Glyn Walters — For services to Tennis and Young People in Garw Valley, Mid Glamorgan
 Stephen James Walters — Principal Library Manager, Gateshead Library Service. For services to Public Libraries.
 Margaret Gail Walthall — For voluntary service to Scouting in Heywood, Metropolitan Borough of Rochdale
 Stephen Walthall — For voluntary service to Scouting in Heywood, Metropolitan Borough of Rochdale
 Peter John Christopher Ward — Driver, Volunteering in Health. For voluntary service to the community in South Devon
 Anne Elizabeth Ward — For services to the community in Burton-on-Trent, Staffordshire
 Kenneth Warren — For services to the community in St Austell, Cornwall
 Nicholas Ian Watson — For voluntary service to Scouting in Rastrick, West Yorkshire
 Kevin Webber — Volunteer, Prostate Cancer UK. For services to People with Cancer
 Martin Charles Webster — Group Scout Leader, 11th Bristol Air Scouts. For voluntary service to Scouting and the community in Bishopsworth, Bristol
 Jason Wenlock — Chief Inspector, Kent Police. For services to Policing and Young People
 Mary Elizabeth Whibley — For services to the community in Bude, Cornwall
 Denise Williams — For voluntary service to Girlguiding in Hartlepool, Cleveland
 Desmond Rex Williams — For services to Snooker and Billiards
 John Williams — Constable, Greater Manchester Police. For services to Policing and charity
 Ronald David Williamson — For services to the community in Bishops Waltham, Hampshire
 Valerie Clara Williamson — For services to the community in North Buckinghamshire
 Laurie Walter Wills — Founder, The Residents Enjoyment and Entertainment Society. For services to Disabled People in Epsom, Surrey
 Judith Winifred Anne Wilson — For services to the community in Sandbach, Cheshire
 Graham Wilson — Special Constable, Police Scotland. For services to Law and Order in the Scottish Borders
 Karl Wilson — Musician. For services to Music and the community in Croydon
 Graham Witter — Organiser and Founder, Weston Christmas Light Display. For services to Charitable Fundraising and to the community in Crewe
 Audrey Wood — For services to the Royal National Lifeboat Institution in North East Scotland
 Mandy Wood (Thomas) — Campaigner, Women's Aid Federation of England. For services to Charitable Fundraising
 Joseph William Woods — For services to the community in Lytham St Annes, Fylde and Wyre, Lancashire
 Gary Leslie Woods — For services to the community in Preston, Lancashire
 Karen Wray — Executive Assistant, Northern Ireland Judiciary. For services to the Judiciary and charity
 Thomas Geoffrey Yeadon — President, Cave Diving Group of Great Britain and Northern Ireland. For services to Cave Diving
 Joanna Julia Yelland — Strategic Director, Exeter City Council. For services to Reducing Health Inequalities
 Marie Zsigmond — Midwife for Safeguarding, Manchester University NHS Foundation Trust. For services to Maternity Safeguarding in the NHS

 Honorary
 Pa Assan Badjan — Emergency Services Porter, Royal London Hospital Emergency Department For services to the NHS 
 Ashraf Hamido Desouki — Chair, A Better Tomorrow community group For service to supporting refugees and asylum seekers in Halton Borough during the COVID-19 Pandemic 
 Onyinye Aureola Enwezor — Shared Governance Clinical Educator, Nottingham University Hospitals NHS Trust For services to the NHS
  Bukola Muhydeen Olamijuwon — Welfare Secretary, Nasrul-Lahi-L-Faith Society (Nasfat) Millwall Branch For services to Nasfat UK and Ireland during COVID-19

Royal Red Cross

Members of the Royal Red Cross (RRC)

Associates of the Royal Red Cross (ARRC)
Major Johan Dews
Flight Lieutenant Jacqueline Mckinnon
Staff Sergeant Helen Marshall
 Sergeant Siobhan Davis
Warrant Officer Class 1 Richard Lazarus

Queen's Police Medal (QPM) 

 England and Wales
 Sergeant Deborah Jane Ashthorpe, Hampshire Constabulary
 Chief Inspector Manjit Kaur Atwal, Leicestershire Police
 Antony Nathaniel Blaker, Deputy Chief Constable, Kent Police
 Sarah Boycott, Lately Assistant Chief Constable, West Midlands Police
 Superintendent Trevor John Clark, Ministry of Defence Police
 Charles David Crichlow, Lately Constable, Greater Manchester Police
 Constable Thomas Graham Albert Farrell, Suffolk Constabulary
 Joanne Tracy Folan, Lately Detective Constable, City of London Police
 Detective Chief Inspector Catherine Anne Forsyth, British Transport Police
 Carl Jason Foulkes, Chief Constable, North Wales Police
 Constable Rani Kaur Gundhu, West Midlands Police
 Rodney Maibom Hansen, Chief Constable, Gloucestershire Constabulary
 Simon Mason, Lately Detective Chief Superintendent, North Yorkshire Police / National Crime Agency
 Sergeant Mohammed Najib, West Midlands Police
 Natalie Louise Shaw, Lately Chief Superintendent, South Yorkshire Police
 Colin Stott, Lately Detective Chief Superintendent, Leicestershire Police
 Detective Chief Inspector John Alan Swinfield, Metropolitan Police Service
 Paul Jeffrey Withers, Lately Detective Superintendent, Lancashire Constabulary

 Northern Ireland
 Constable Anthony Kerr, Police Service of Northern Ireland
 Constable David John Smyth, Police Service of Northern Ireland
 Chief Superintendent Simon Walls, Police Service of Northern Ireland

Queen's Fire Service Medal (QFSM) 

 England and Wales
 Mark Andrew Cashin, Chief Fire Officer & Chief Executive, Cheshire Fire and Rescue Service
 Julie King, Group Manager, East Sussex Fire and Rescue Service
 Sean Julian Bone-Knell, Lately Assistant Chief Fire Officer & Director Operations, Kent Fire and Rescue Service
 Christopher Lowther, Chief Fire Officer, Tyne and Wear Fire and Rescue Service

Queen's Ambulance Medal (QAM) 

 England and Wales
 Paul John Henry, Operational Leadership, East of England Ambulance Service NHS Trust
 Richard James Marlow, Paramedic and Lead Manager for Helicopter Emergency Medical Services, South Western Ambulance Service NHS Foundation Trust
 Ian Michael Price, Emergency Medical Technician, Welsh Ambulance Services NHS Trust

 Northern Ireland
 Elizabeth Lawrence Coulter, Ambulance Service Area Manager, Northern Ireland

Queen's Volunteer Reserves Medal (QVRM) 

Colour Sergeant David Hill, Royal Marines
Captain Hisham Bahjat Halawi
Colonel Robert Stuart Thomas Murphy
Colonel Mark Andrew Simpson
Major David Arthur Titheridge
Lieutenant Colonel Llewelyn Tremayne Williams

Australia 

The 2020 Queen's Birthday Honours for Australia were announced on 8 June 2020 by the Governor-General, David Hurley.

New Zealand 

The 2020 Queen's Birthday Honours for New Zealand were announced on 1 June 2020.

See also 
Australian honours system
New Zealand royal honours system
Orders, decorations, and medals of the United Kingdom
2020 Canadian Honours List

References

External links
UK Birthday Honours List 2020
UK Birthday Honours List (COVID-19) 2020

Birthday Honours
2020 awards
2020 awards in the United Kingdom